= South African Wool Board =

Statutory board (1946–1997)

The South African Wool Board was constituted in 1946 as an independent and non-profit making statutory board under the Wool Act (Act No 19 of 1946) in response to the rapid rise synthetic replacements for natural wool fibre. It was wound up in 1997.

== Objectives ==
Improve marketing research, advertising and technical research of South Africa's wool and wool textiles.

== History ==
The board was founded in 1946 under the Wool Act (Act No 19 of 1946). In 1972 the Wool Commission was merged with it. It was wound up in 1997.

== Funding ==
It was funded by a levy imposed on all wool sales in the Union of South Africa.

== See also ==
- South African Wool
- International Wool Secretariat
- Australian Wool Board
- New Zealand Wool Board
- British Wool Marketing Board
