= Cape Wool =

South African wool

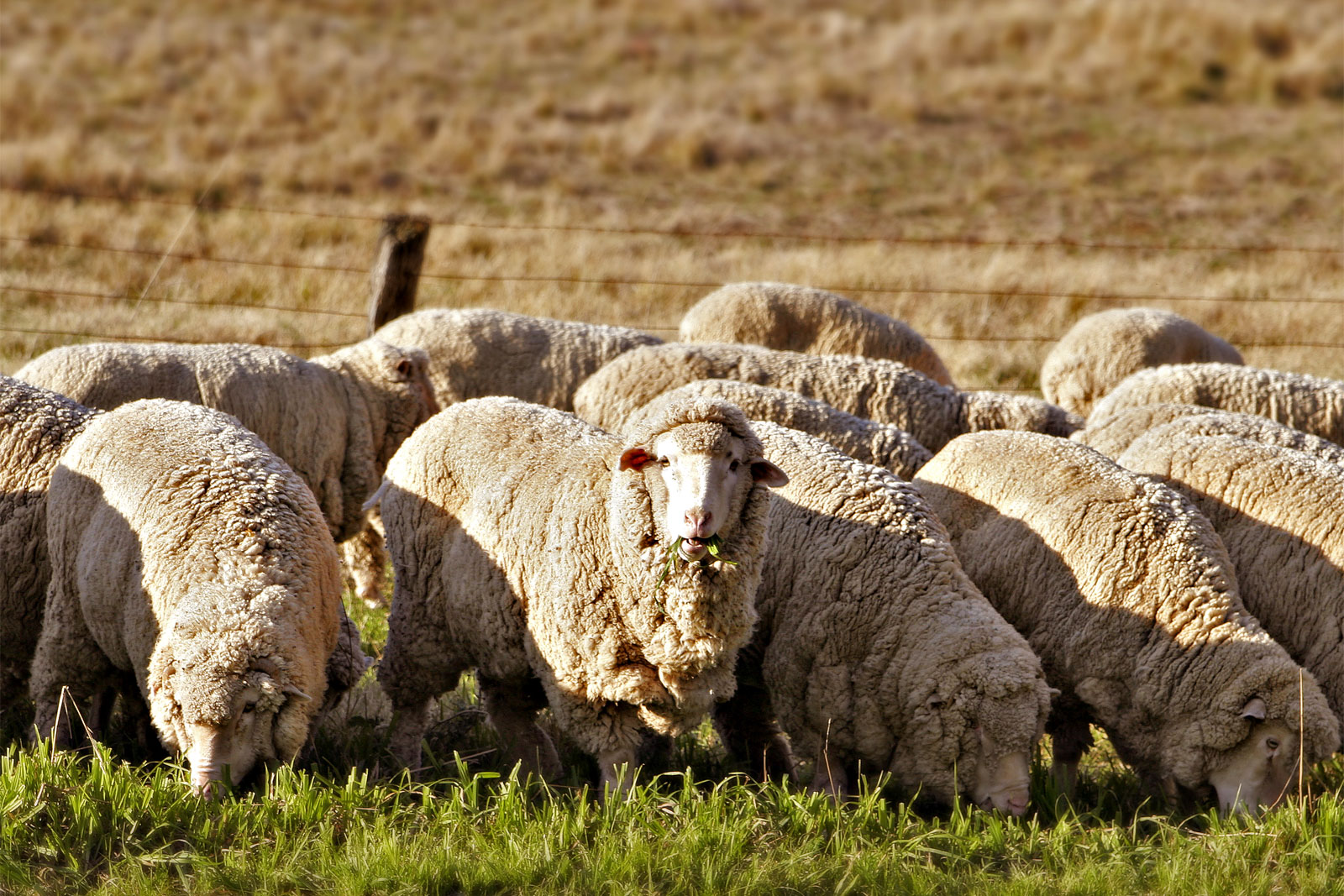
Unshorn Merino sheep

Cape Wool is any wool that originates from the Republic of South Africa; it is the generic name for South African wool. It has a white color with silky and fine staple, but wool hairs are shorter in length with less elasticity and stained also. Cape snow-white was the British way of describing Cape wool when it was imported to England in the 18th century.

Mohair from South Africa was referred to as Cape mohair.

== History ==
Historically, there was no wool production in South Africa. In 1680, the native South African sheep did not have wool. Then the first white settlers imported Spanish merinos and crossed them with the local sheep. The production and export of wool commenced in 1716. Merino exports were begun only after 1775 when large quantities of merino were imported from Spain.

== Quality and Use ==
Cape Wool has several variations from coarse to fine. It has less crimp, and it is more tendering and less elastic than Australian wool. Hence, used for shawls and hosiery goods and the materials need less or no felting. The quality of "Cape Snow White Wool" is similar to Australian wool; its whiteness commends it for particular dress materials.

== Cape Wools SA ==
Cape Wools SA functions similar to the British Wool Marketing Board. It is a nonprofit organisation that has many roles, including promotion of the term "Cape Wool".

== See also ==
- African textiles, Textiles originating in and around continental Africa or through the African Diaspora.
- South African Wool Board
