= International Wool Secretariat =

Agricultural organisation

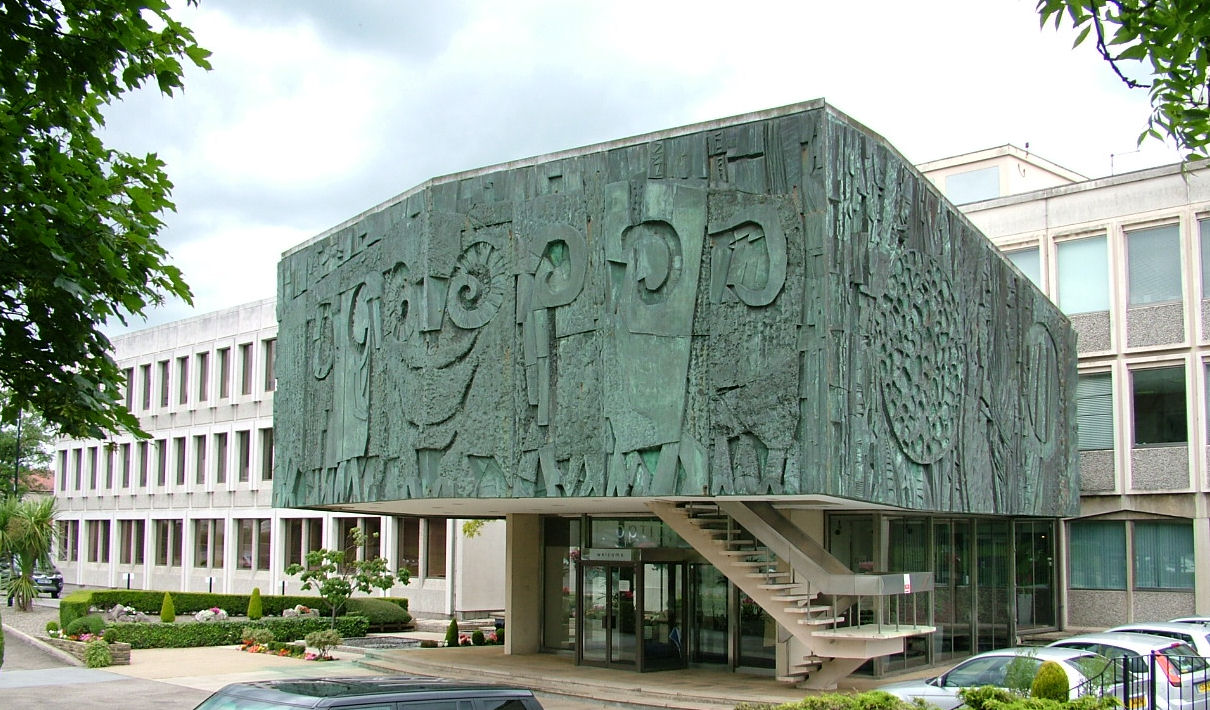
International Wool Secretariat building, Ben Rhydding, Ilkley, Yorkshire, England

The International Wool Secretariat (IWS) was formed in 1937 to promote the sale of wool on behalf of woolgrowers and review research carried out by independent bodies such as the Wool Industries' Research Association at Torridon, Headingley Lane, Leeds, England.

IWS was formed by the Wool Boards of Australia, New Zealand and South Africa, and funded by levies on wool grown in those countries. Uruguay joined IWS in 1970. The IWS was the overseas extension of the Australian Wool Corporation and eventually was merged into it.

In 1997, IWS changed its name to The Woolmark Company. Since 2007, the Woolmark Company has been a subsidiary of Australian Wool Innovation Limited (AWI), a nonprofit organization that conducts research, development and marketing along the global supply chain for Australian wool on behalf of approximately 60,000 woolgrowers that cooperatively fund the company.

== History ==
In 1936, in response to the surge in the production of artificial fibres, such as rayon (now polyester), used in place of wool, woolgrowers in the three main woolgrowing countries, led by Australia, voted to impose a 6 pence levy for each wool bale produced, with the funds going to research and promotion. (Germany alone produced 9,200 tons of these artificial fibres in 1934, 19,600 tons in 1935 and 45,000 tons in 1936. It had been estimated that the production for 1937 would be 90,000 tons.) On July 1, 1937, they formed the International Wool Publicity and Research Secretariat, which was quickly renamed the International Wool Secretariat (IWS). Based in London, the IWS had offices in every major wool-producing country by the mid-1950s.

In 1964, IWS developed and launched the Woolmark logo.

In December 1993, the Australian Wool Corporation (formed in 1973) and the Wool Research and Development Corporation were merged to form the Australian Wool Research and Promotion Organisation (AWRAP). International Wool Secretariat (IWS) and Australian Wool Innovation Limited (AWI) were subsidiaries of AWRAP.

In 1997, IWS’s name was changed to The Woolmark Company Pty Ltd (TWC).

In 2001, Australian Wool Services Limited (AWS) was formed to resolve 36 legacy issues stretching back more than 80 years through previous administrations, including AWRAP and its two subsidiaries. AWI was de-merged from AWS in 2002 and TWC was sold by AWS to AWI in 2007.

What remained of AWS became Graziers’ Investment Company Limited (GIC), which went into liquidation in October 2017, with A$20 million in its bank account. As at March 2020, GIC was close to finalising the liquidation.

=== Visits ===
The Princess Royal visited on Tuesday May 7, 1991.

== Woolmark ==
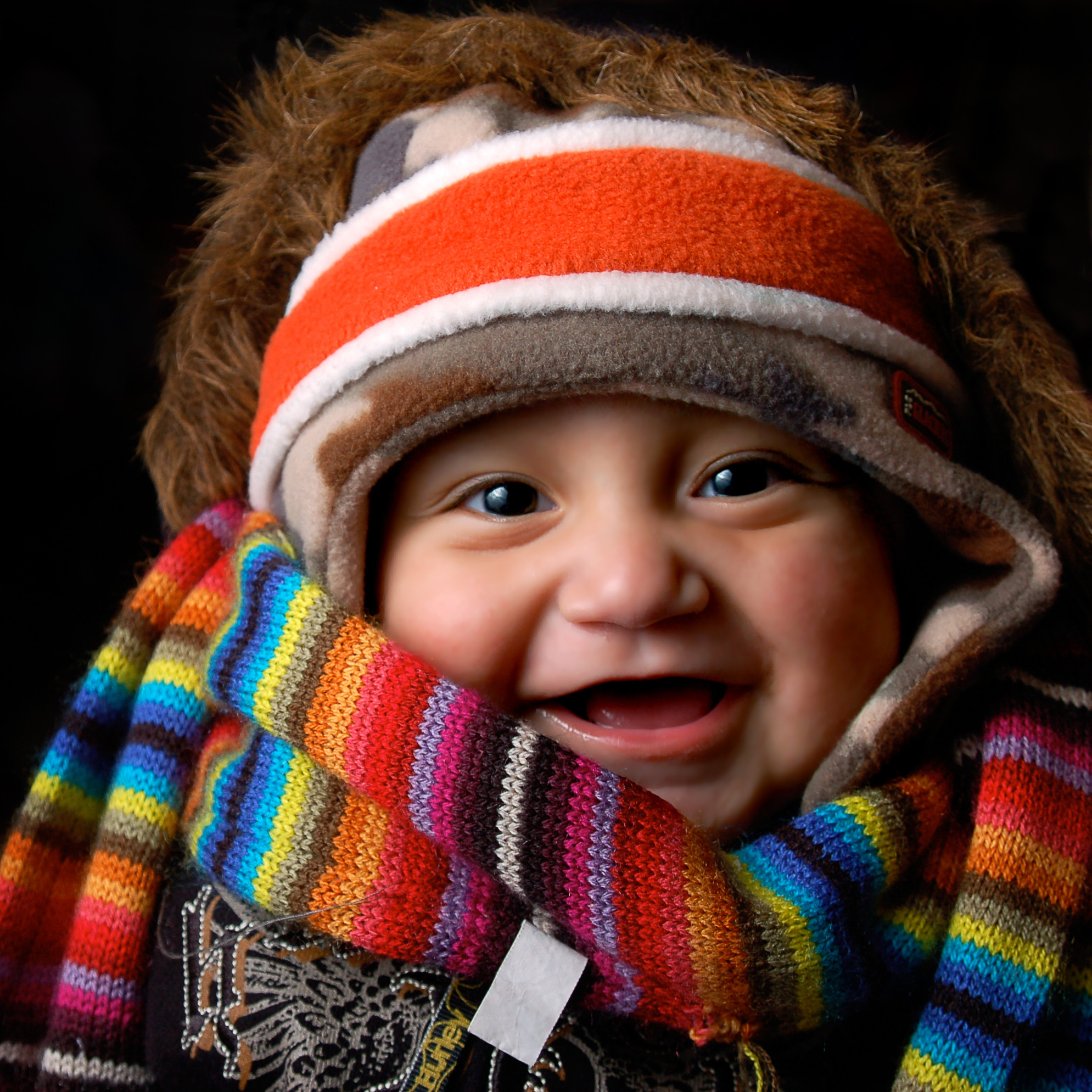
Wool scarf

The Woolmark logo was developed by the IWS, then under the control of two Australians, William (Archer) Gunn (1914-2003) who was chairman and William Vines (1916-2011) as managing director.

A certification mark used on pure wool products that met the standard of quality set by IWS. The logo was launched in August 1964 after it had been selected following a 1963 competition won by Milanese Francesco Saroglia (most probably a pseudonym chosen by designer Franco Grignani).

The two main objectives were to position wool at the top of the textile market and to ensure that products bearing the Woolmark label were made from pure new wool and manufactured to the highest standards. It was such a success it eventually ranked with a large scallop shell or three-pointed-star in terms of consumer recognition and understanding.

In 2011, British design magazine, Creative Review, declared the Woolmark number one of the top twenty logos of all time.

== International Woolmark Prize ==
In 1953, IWS launched the International Woolmark Prize, with winners including Yves Saint Laurent and Karl Lagerfeld. The award continues to recognise outstanding designers across the globe. It was later suspended.

The International Woolmark Prize was relaunched in 2012 by IWS’s successor, The Woolmark Company (TWC). The objective of the award is to generate long-term demand for Australian Merino wool by increasing the knowledge of and lifetime loyalty to the fibre amongst the competition’s designers around the globe. The 2020 awards were made in February 2020 at the London Fashion Week.

== Boston Marathon promotion ==
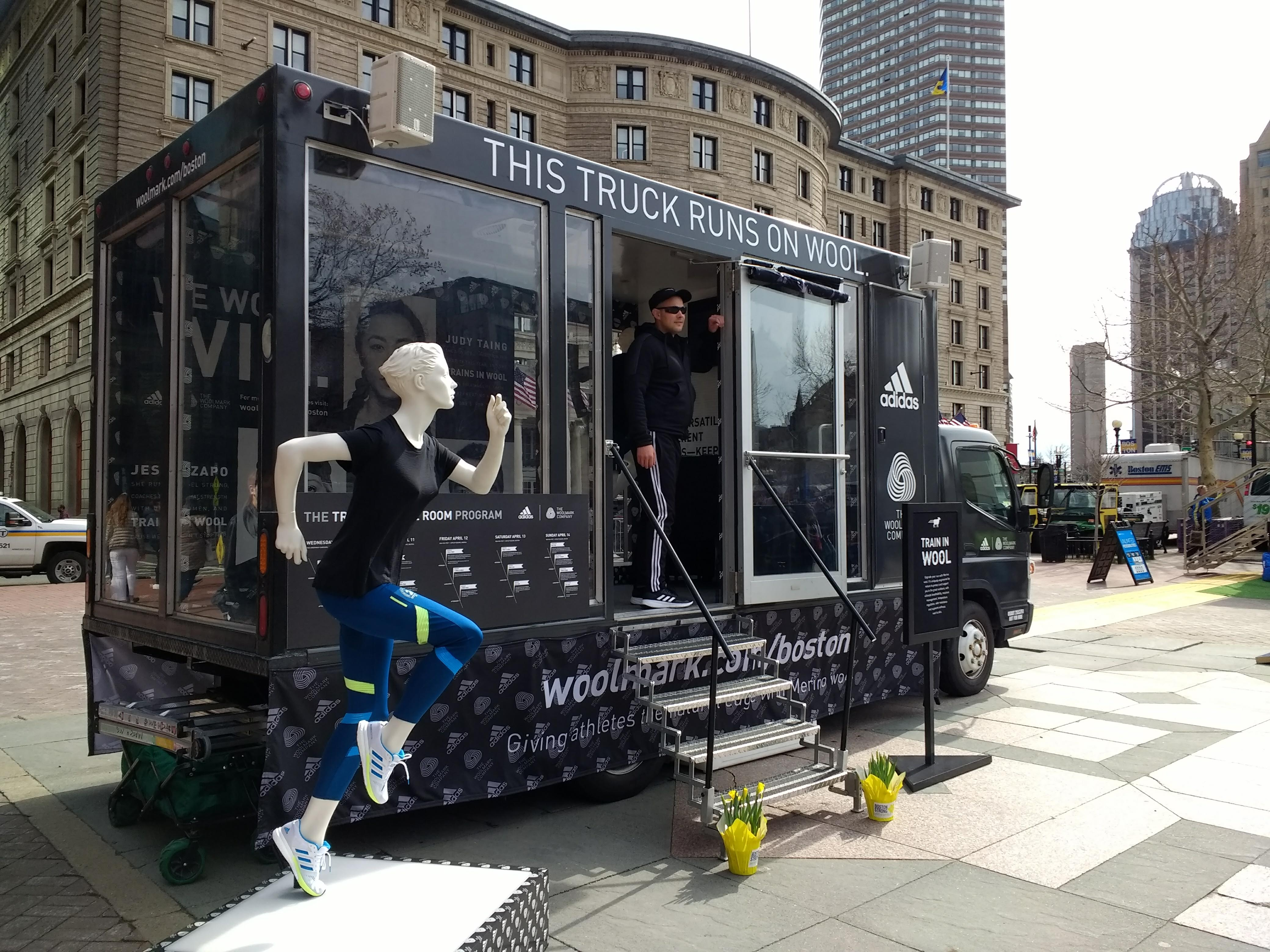
The Adidas/Woolmark Company experience at the 2019 Boston Marathon highlighting Australian merino wool performance clothing.

The Woolmark Company formed a partnership with Adidas and the Boston Athletic Association to design and manufacture the first Best in Class running shirts, which were given to the top twenty 2018 Boston Marathon finishers in each age group. The shirts were made of 75% merino wool and 25% polyamide (nylon).

== See also ==
- Australian Wool Innovation Limited
- International Wool Textile Organisation
- British Wool Marketing Board
- Worshipful Company of Woolmen
