= Afua Sam =

Ghanaian American fashion designer

Afua Sam is a Ghanaian fashion designer, philanthropist and founder of Studio D'Maxsi Designs and The A Concept by Afua Sam - fashion labels based in Washington, D.C., United States specializing in one-off bespoke and ready to wear apparels mostly for women and children. She is the founder of Afua’s Foundation, a non-profit organization focused on raising awareness and funds for cancer advocacy, anti-bullying campaign and domestic violence relief.

== Career ==
Afua started her fashion design career in her teen years as a self-taught apparel maker, initially adopting sewing as a hobby and personal coping mechanism with hardship brought by her father’s passing. In 1995, Afua moved to the U.S and took a job as a babysitter. She used her savings from the job to purchase her first American sewing machine and started sewing for a local sweatshirt maker and other designers in DC.

In 2006, she launched her own fashion label, Studio D’Maxsi Designs specializing in one-off bespoke apparels including custom suits, red carpet gowns and party dresses. In 2017, she introduced a new label, The A concept by Afua Sam focused on designing chic and affordable ready to wear apparels with blend of traditional African fabrics such as Adire and Ankara with colorful geometric prints.

Her work has earned her some awards and honors including Art in Motion Icon Award 2026, Divas of Colour Awards (London) 2026, and DC Fashion Week Hall of Fame Inductee 2019.
