= Australian Wool Board =

Statutory board overview
- Formed: 28 May 1936
- Dissolved: 31 December 1972
- Superseding agencies: Australian Wool Bureau; Australian Wool Corporation [I]
- Jurisdiction: Australia
- Headquarters: Melbourne, Victoria

The Australian Wool Board was an Australian Government statutory board that existed in its first phase between May 1936 and January 1945; in its second phase between June 1945 and June 1953; and in its third and final phase, between May 1963 and December 1972. The first Wool Board, in 1936, together with the Wool Boards of New Zealand and South Africa decided to form an organisation to promote wool, to meet the growing challenge from synthetic fibres, which led to the formation in 1937 of the International Wool Secretariat. There have been other reorganisations of the management of the wool sector in Australia since.

The functions of each of the three Boards varied, with third reincarnation having the widest powers that included the promotion of the use of wool and wool products in Australia and other countries; the power to inquire into, and from time to time report upon the methods of marketing wool and any other matters connected with the marketing of wool; and such other functions as were conferred on the Board by the Australian Government or as approved by the Minister for Primary Industries.

The activities of the Board were funded by a levy on woolgrowers first instituted to finance wool promotion activities in 1936 and later supplemented by funding from the Australian Government.

== Objectives ==
The objectives of the third Wool Board were:

- Joint international promotion of wool products through the International Wool Secretariat with the Wool Boards of New Zealand, South Africa, and Uruguay;
- Provision of testing services for wool and wool products;
- Provision of advice to government on wool research activities by government bodies in relation to the needs of the wool industry; and
- Oversight of all aspects of wool marketing but without executive powers over marketing.

== Subsequent reorganisations ==
The Australian Wool Bureau existed between July 1953 and May 1963.

The Australian Wool Commission (AWC), created in November 1970, was replaced in January 1973 by the Australian Wool Corporation (AWC). The International Wool Secretariat (IWS) was an overseas extension of Wool Corporation and was merged into it. IWS had established the Woolmark trade mark in 1964 and owned it.

In 1991, the functions of the AWC were divided between three newly established entities: the Australian Wool Realisation Commission (AWRC), the Australian Wool Corporation [II] and the Wool Research and Development Corporation (WRDC). AWRC continued to operate until 2002, with the main task being the liquidation of the wool stockpile arising from the failed Australian Wool Reserve Price Scheme.

In December 1993, the Australian Wool Corporation and WRDC were merged to form the Australian Wool Research and Promotion Organisation (AWRAP). AWRAP had two subsidiaries: IWS and Australian Wool Innovation Limited (AWI). In 1997, the name of IWS was changed to The Woolmark Company.

Australian Wool Services Limited (AWS) was formed in 2001, and succeeded AWRAP. AWI was de-merged from AWS in 2002 and The Woolmark Company was sold by AWS to AWI in 2007.

== See also ==
- British Wool Marketing Board
