= William Archer Gunn =

Australian grazier (1914–2003)

William Archer (Bill) Gunn (1914–2003), later Sir William Gunn, was an Australian grazier and wool industry leader. Among other industry roles, he was a long serving chairman of the Australian Wool Board. He is associated with the Australian Wool Reserve Price Scheme, an eventually disastrous market intervention in the global wool market that he championed, which operated between 1970 and 1991. He was also associated with the successful international marketing of wool and Woolmark logo.

== Early years and family context ==
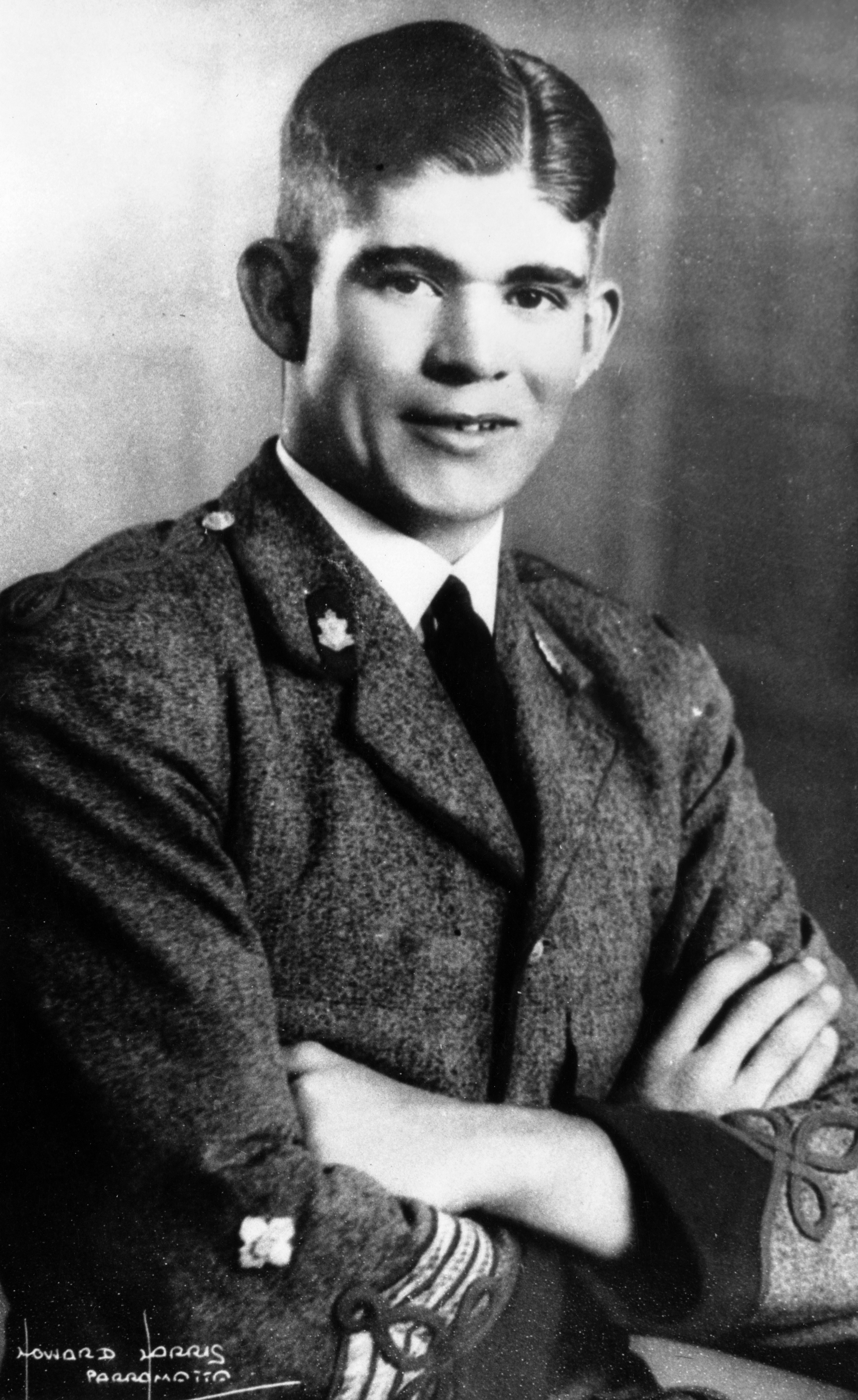
Gunn at King's School c.1931.

Gunn was born on 25 February 1914, at Goondiwindi, Queensland. He was the son of Walter Gunn, a grazier, and his wife, Doris Isabel née Brown. His grandfather was Donald Gunn, grazier and Queensland politician, and his great-grandfather Donald Gunn was an immigrant from Scotland who became a squatter.

He was a student at The Kings School, in Sydney, where he excelled at sport—playing rugby union football, rowing, and settling a high jump record—rather than academically. He played for the GPS 2nd Combined XV in 1932.

He was an imposing figure, 1.88 m tall and weighing around 120 kg. His trademark hair style was a centre-line part, perhaps fashionable in the early 1930s, but which he maintained for the rest of his long life. He was a notoriously dishevelled dresser, who could appear to be untidy, even when wearing the finest of wool suits. He usually wore a woollen double-breasted suit; Sir Hardy Amies once remarked that Gunn was "a problem" at fittings.

== Early career ==
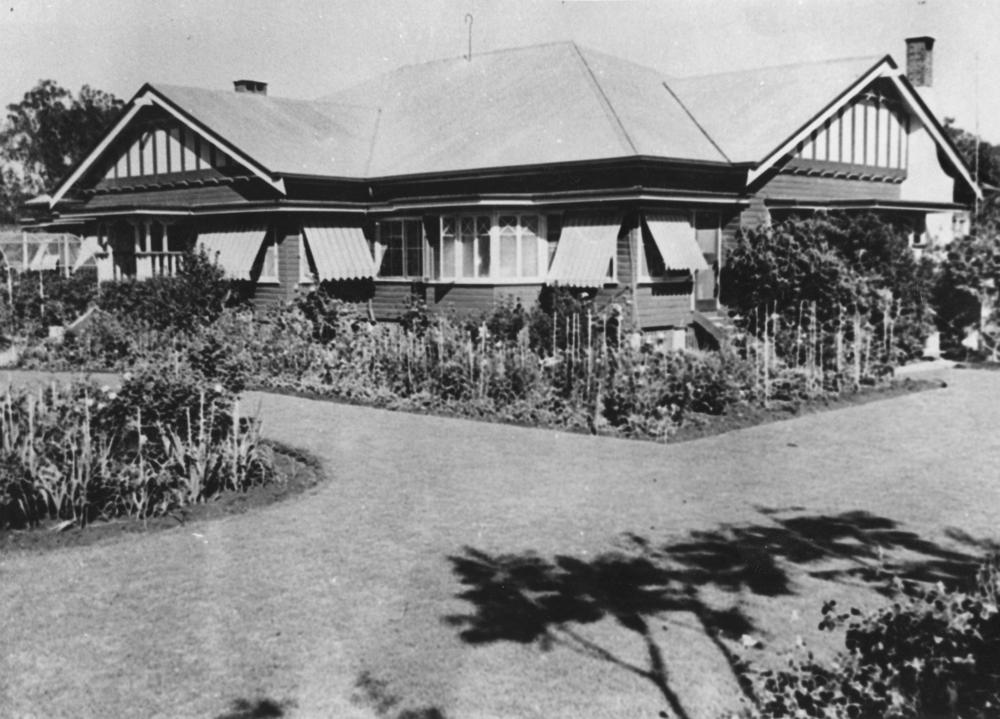
House and garden at Kildonan Station c.1945

Leaving school in 1932, he returned to Queensland and by 1933 was managing one of his family's sheep stations, Kildonan, carrying 14,000 sheep. After returning to Queensland, he played rugby league; in 1936, he played for the Newtown team in Toowoomba, driving the 175 miles from Goondiwindi for games.

He recognized that brigalow country, hitherto considered wasteland, could be productive land if cleared, and he was an early successful pioneer of unlocking its potential.

In 1936, he fell through a glass window, severing veins and tendons in his left wrist. He was left with a permanently disabled left hand. No longer able to do physical work, while he maintained ownership and management of grazing properties, he began to concentrate his efforts on rural industry associations and lobbying on their behalf. The accident also ended his sporting career, and it probably explains why he did not serve in the Second World War.

== Industry leader and political involvement ==
During the long years of coalition government from 1949 to 1972, Gunn had ready access to the highest levels of Australian government. He was closely associated with and admired by long-serving politician, later leader of the Country Party, and Deputy Prime Minister of Australia, John 'Black Jack' McEwan (1900–1980), who was briefly the Prime Minister in 1968–1969.

McEwen pursued—leveraging his minority party's essential role in keeping the larger Liberal Party of Australia in power, as a coalition government—what became known as 'McEwenism'. It was a policy of high tariff protection for the manufacturing industry, intended to ensure that industry and trade unions would not oppose government support for primary industries, particularly grazing and agriculture. It was a part of what was known as the "Australian settlement" which promoted high wages, industrial development, government intervention in industry, and decentralisation. McEwan's views closely aligned with those of Gunn, who was both a life-long advocate for and a practitioner of government intervention in support of rural industries.

In 1951, Gunn became chairman of both the United Graziers of Queensland and the Australian Graziers Federation. From 1955 to 1958, he chaired the Australian Woolgrowers' Council. These were years of great prosperity as wool prices climbed during the Korean War and its aftermath. John McEwan's personal triumph of the signing of the Japan–Australia Commerce Agreement, in 1957, promised further prosperity for Australian rural industries. In 1961, Gunn became chairman of the International Wool Secretariat and, in 1963, chairman of the Australian Wool Board. He was then in a position to guide implementation of his long-term policy objectives, increased marketing of the wool clip and introducing a reserve price scheme for wool.

He took on other roles in government-owned or government-sponsored organisations, joining the board of the Commonwealth Bank in 1952 and the Reserve Bank of Australia in 1959. He also served on the boards of the Australian Meat Council, the Australian Wool Testing Authority, and the Australian Export Development Council.

Gunn later said of his career, "I had to fight the woolgrowers, the selling agents, the buyers and at times my own board." His view usually prevailed, and he dominated the rural industry organisation boards on which he served, but, as Doug Anthony observed, "He tended to make enemies by being a bit too strong in his proposals."

John McEwan favoured Gunn as his successor to lead the Country Party. However, Gunn had made enough enemies in rural circles to make it difficult to enter politics. In September 1965, Gunn stood for preselection, as a Country Party candidate for the federal seat of Maranoa, but was defeated in a party ballot by James Corbett. After John McEwen retired from politics, in 1971, Gunn continued to have a close association with the County Party's new leader and Deputy Prime Minister, Doug Anthony.

Although Gunn was closely allied to the Country Party (later National Country Party and then National Party), he was not adverse to working with their opponents, the Australian Labor Party, during the periods of Labor government. In April 1975, he was involved in a little-known, third, and last iteration of what became known as the 'loans affair'. After a telephone call with the Prime Minister, Gough Whitlam, Gunn attempted for raise $3.7 billion in loan funds from European-based petrodollar sources, bypassing Treasury. These attempts were ended, after the Treasurer, Bill Hayden, threatened to resign in protest. Hayden reportedly had referred to Gunn's efforts as "madness", during a discussion with Sir Frederick Wheeler, head of Treasury. This happened at a time when Gunn was still on the board of the Reserve Bank of Australia. He was not reappointed to that board in 1977.

== Honours ==
Gunn was given three honours; Companion of the Order of St Michael and St George (CMG), in 1955 for 'services to the pastoral industry'; Knight Commander of the Order of the British Empire (KBE), in 1961 as 'chairman of the Australian Wool Bureau'; and Companion of the Order of Australia (AC), in 1990 for his 'continued service to primary industry'.

== Wool marketing and reserve price scheme for wool ==
=== Gunn era ===
Ideas about a reserve price scheme for wool, intended to stabilise the price of wool, predated Gunn's involvement. In Australia, those ideas go back, at the latest, to the later part of the Second World War. A large wool stockpile had accumulated during the war; wool production had boomed and enemy nations were no longer able to participate in the wool market. An arrangement called the Dominions-UK Wool Disposal Plan (also known as the 'Joint Organisation', or 'J.O.') was set up in 1945, specifically to dispose of the stockpile. As the stockpile decreased, woolgrowers began to advocate for a new 'Post-J.O.' scheme to market wool. However, the subsequent boom in wool prices, during the Korean War, appears to have put such plans on hold.

As early as 1951, Gunn had advocated a scheme for stabilising the price of wool, using a reserve price scheme. Essentially, such a scheme involved a floor price, below which any unsold wool would be bought and temporarily stockpiled by the industry; the aim being to sell it back into the market, later and at a more favourable price. He made no progress on this matter, during the years of high wool prices. In 1965, a referendum of wool growers overwhelmingly rejected a reserve price scheme. However, Gunn continued to lobby for a reserve price scheme.

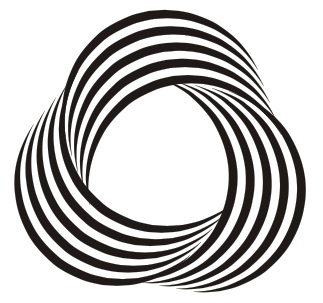
Woolmark logo

Gunn also saw the need for marketing wool to maintain demand, as the fibre became more exposed to competition from cotton and synthetic fibres, and more subject to blending with other fibres. One of his first actions, after becoming chairman of the Australian Wool Board, in 1963, was to increase the levy on wool paid by growers on wool, which was used to broaden the market for wool. This was a far from a universally popular move, and he was pelted with fruit, eggs, and flour bombs, by aggrieved wool growers, at Hamilton, in July 1963.

An early success of Gunn's marketing efforts was the International Wool Secretariat's Woolmark logo, introduced in August 1964 and used to indicate that the product was 'pure new wool'. In 2011, British design magazine, Creative Review, declared the Woolmark logo to be number one of the top twenty logos of all time.

In 1970, falling wool prices finally caused the government to adopt Gunn's reserve price scheme, but now as a means of saving the declining wool industry. Much of the text of the legislation could be drawn from earlier work dating from two previous attempts to create such legislation, in 1951, and the updates made in 1964. The scheme would be operated by a new statutory authority, Australian Wool Commission, established in November 1970. It was independent of the Australian Wool Board, although its new chairman, William Vines, was a long term associate of Gunn. Gunn and Vines had selected the seven board members. It began to buy wool on 16 November 1970. Selection of the undisclosed 'floating' floor price would be critical, as would the underlying demand for wool and the response of wool buyers.

The new Australian Wool Commission was to have a working capital of $115 million annually, expected to come from trading banks. Its operating costs, forecast to be $18.7 million, was to be borne jointly by wool growers, via a levy on wool sales, and the government. Doug Anthony stated that an objective of the new commission was to stabilise wool prices, not increase those prices above those determined by the market.

Vines told the press that he believed that the scheme would result in stable wool prices, and that there was no expectation that a large stockpile would form. However, by early 1971, wool prices had fallen—to real price levels not seen since 1931, during the Great Depression—and by the end of June 1971—the end of the wool selling season— the corporation held 440,000 wool bales, valued at around $40 million. Worse was to come, because rumours that the commission had run out of money caused buyers to abstain from the market, more or less completely, for fear of over-paying if the scheme were to collapse. The commission bought 90% of the lots offered in August 1971, and the wool ended up in the now massive stockpile.

The commission had effectively run out of money in late 1971. The Liberal Party tried to end the scheme, in a Cabinet meeting in October 1971, but their Country Party colleagues threatened to withdraw from the coalition, and got their way. The result was an additional $30 million of government-guaranteed loans to keep the commission in operation, and the stockpile grew to 931,000 bales in December 1971.

In March 1972, the Australian Wool Board and Australian Wool Commission were amalgamated into a new organisation, the Australian Wool Corporation (AWC), which would be responsible for wool marketing and market intervention under the reserve price scheme. The McMahon government lost the December 1972 elections, and the incoming Whitlam government purged some members of the new corporation's board—those with connection to the former government—including Gunn. The new organisation that emerged was intended to effectively compulsorily acquire around 90% of the wool clip and be responsible for marketing it. The concept of compulsory acquisition had been supported by Gunn.

=== After Gunn (1973—1990) ===
The proposed approach of the new Australian Wool Corporation—its rejection of competitive market principles—led to immediate strong opposition by wool buyers and the World Trade Organisation. There was also opposition in Australia from those favouring free markets. The opposition led to the abandonment of the compulsory acquisition, but the corporation still achieved much of what had been intended, by continued operation of the reserve price scheme.

Although Gunn had by then departed from the Australian Wool Corporation, his influence lived on in the form of its new chairman, David Asimus. Asimus was a more polished individual than Gunn, but just as firm on intervention. The corporation took on the outward appearance of a successful trading organisation, and some aspects of the excesses that characterized some other debt-funded Australian businesses of the 1980s, including its own art collection. However, if the reserve price scheme of the Gunn era had the intention of stabilizing the price, the new management took a more aggressive approach, apparently aiming to actively manage an increase the price of wool over time.

It was in 1987 that responsibility for determining the floor price of wool was given to the Wool Council of Australia, an organisation representing wool growers. Later, it was a long term critic of the scheme, Jim Maple-Brown, who succinctly identified what became an essential flaw in the concept of the reserve price scheme, "the floor price is now determined by people with a vested interest in keeping the price of wool as high as possible".

The scheme had worked reasonably well, until the mid-1980s, but eventually over-confidence set in, and the reserve level was raised too much. In 1987, the relevant Minister was removed from the reserve price setting process, and the floor price came to be set by the Wool Council. It set the floor price at a high 830 cents a kilogram. Initially, this was not a problem, New Chinese, Russian and Eastern European buyers added to demand, and high prevailing market prices even allowed existing stockpiled wool to be sold into the buoyant market.

The corporation increased the floor price again, in June 1988, to an all-time high of 870 cents per kilogram. The floor price had risen by 70%, since 1987, when the Wool Council was given control of its setting. During the selling season after that decision, the market collapsed. For various reasons, both the Chinese and the Russian mills all but stopped buying wool. The AWC kept buying the wool coming onto the auctions in Australia, at the high floor price. Before long, the AWC had exhausted its billion dollar plus reserves, and started borrowing more. Warehouses all over Australia were bursting with a massive and apparently unsalable wool stockpile, but the AWC and the Wool Council resolutely refused to consider any reduction in the floor price.

It is accepted economic theory, that a floor price has no effect when the market price is above the floor price, but results in a surplus of production when the floor price is maintained above the free-market price. In essence, that is what happened, with a huge stockpile of Australian wool accumulating. Production rose by 19% after 1987. The resultant surplus of supply then had the effect of depressing the market price further. Buyers sensed that, eventually, either the reserve price scheme would collapse, releasing the surplus wool into the market, as the huge stockpile was liquidated, or the floor price would be lowered.

The responsible government minister, John Kerin, delivered a well reasoned argument, for a lower floor price, in a speech that he gave at a wool growers conference, at Roma, on 23 May 1990. After hearing the speech, Gunn was reported to have approached John Kerin saying, "John you gotta do something about this. You gotta lower the floor". It seems that he had a change of mind about a lower floor price for wool, sensing that Kerin was right. However, by then, Gunn could no longer influence the outcome. The Australian Wool Corporation board and Australian Wool Council remained implacably opposed to either lowering the floor price of 870 cents per kilogram or abandoning the scheme altogether.

Finally, Kerin exercised his ministerial power to set the floor price himself, at 700 cents a kilogram, effective from July 1990, the beginning of the new selling season. Apart from alienating buyers who had bought at the old price, this had little effect on the falling demand for wool. It was too little too late; the market was in effect signalling that the floor price was still too high. The AWC continued to buy wool at the floor price.

=== Failure of the reserve price scheme ===
By August 1990, the stockpile stood at 3.25 million bales. With Australia in a recession, unemployment at 11%, and short term interest rates at 18%, the Wool Corporation's borrowings and the reduced export income, due to their wool buying, were negatively affecting Australia's current account. By September 1990, the stockpile was 3.5 million bales, with the market price just above the floor price. But the government and Wool Corporation both tried to tough out the situation, without a further drop in the 700 cent floor price, and tried to resolve the situation by a massive reduction in supply; 15 to 20 million sheep would be slaughtered, and each grower could only sell two-thirds of their previous clip into the market. By November 1991, the stockpile reached 4.2 million bales, nearly equivalent to a whole year's production. It was anticipated that, if the stockpile were to reach 5 million bales, just the annual cost for its storage would be $560 million. It reached 4.77 million bales on 1 February 1991, the day that the suspension of sales was announced, after the government refused to guarantee more debt to fund wool purchases by the AWC.

On 11 February 1991, the Cabinet took a decision to end the reserve price scheme and return to the free market. A sum of $300 million was allocated to top up growers incomes to the 700 cent floor price, but only until June 1991. That still left a debt of around $3.1 billion and the monstrous stockpile. The Australian Wool Corporation was put into receivership—one of the largest corporate failures in Australia's history—and the debt would be repaid by selling off the stockpile and other assets of the corporation The stockpiled wool would be sold off over the next 11 years.

=== Aftermath ===
Within a week of resuming free market operation, the wool price was 428 cents per kilogram. Necessary as it was, the restoration of the free market was disastrous for those buyers who had contracts from the days of the 700 cent floor price, leading to series of large losses and some bankruptcies of European apparel manufacturers. A legacy of the Wool Corporation years was the destruction of the once solid relationship that had existed with the European and Japanese wool buyers. Substitution of wool for other fibres grew, during the final years of corporation, and artificially high prices made wool buyers seek out cheaper wool, from South America and Russia.

Australian wool production dived, and many growers left the industry. Australian wool production, in 2025, was forecast to be the lowest in 100 years. The disruptions, caused by the reserve price scheme and its end, accelerated trends in the apparel business, with production moving to newer, more modern plants in China. China now buys around 80% of wool sold in Australia, and it now grows a significant amount of wool itself.

== Family, later life, and death ==
Gunn married Mary Haydon, in 1939. The couple had three children, a son and two daughters.

Gunn had various business interests. It was his heavy investment in the cattle industry of the Northern Territory that led to the loss of much of his personal fortune, around $3 million, when his company, Gunn Developments, temporarily entered receivership, in March 1977. The company had been a victim of a huge cattle price slump, in 1973, and high costs. Four other Gunn-controlled companies also went into receivership. He had already set up a successful consultancy organisation, Gunn Rural Management, which continued to operate, and he was involved in introducing large numbers of the Charolais breed of cattle to Australia.

The last of the stockpiled wool was sold in 2001. Gunn lived long enough to see the end of the reserve price scheme, and many of its consequences.

After a long illness, Gunn died, aged 89, on 17 April 2003, at Goondiwindi. His wife had died in 2001, and Helen, his daughter, in 1992. He donated photographs and papers of the Gunn family, to the State Library of Queensland.
