= New Zealand Wool Board =

Former New Zealand promotional body for wool

The New Zealand Wool Board was a New Zealand public body established in 1944 under the Wool Industry Act, whose key objective was "to obtain, in the interests of growers, the best possible returns for New Zealand Wool".

The board was based at Wool House, in Wellington, and funded by a levy on the proceeds of growers' wool sales.

== Abolition ==
McKinsey & Company published a report in 2000 which sparked two years of debate for referendums and reforms to the New Zealand Wool Board. In 2001, McKinsey's recommendations were implemented and the Wool Board was dissolved.

== See also ==
- International Wool Secretariat

- Australian Wool Board
- South African Wool Board

- British Wool Marketing Board
