= African textiles =

Textiles originating in and around continental Africa or through the African Diaspora

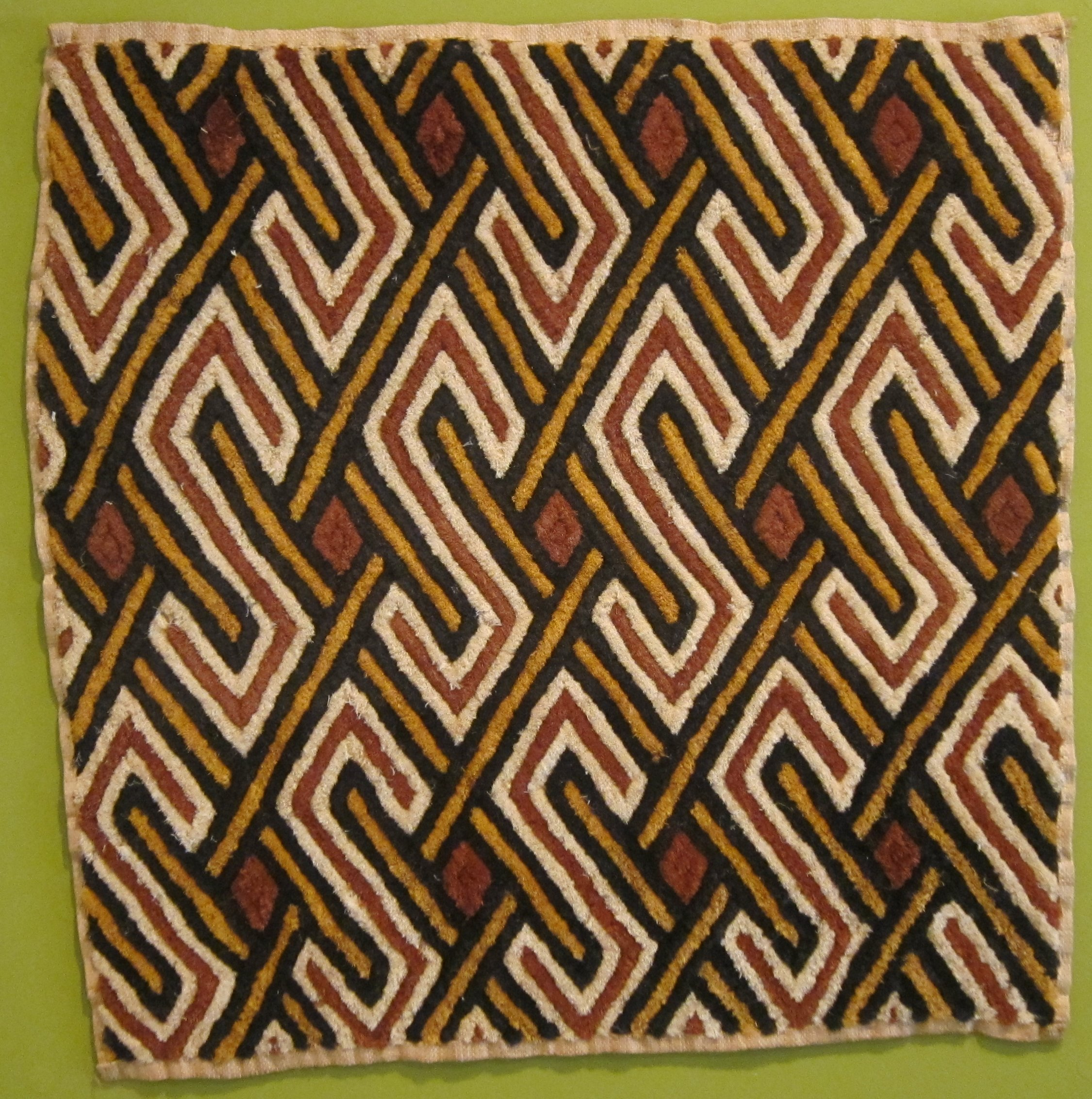
Kuba Raffia cloth, made by the Kuba of present-day Democratic Republic of Congo

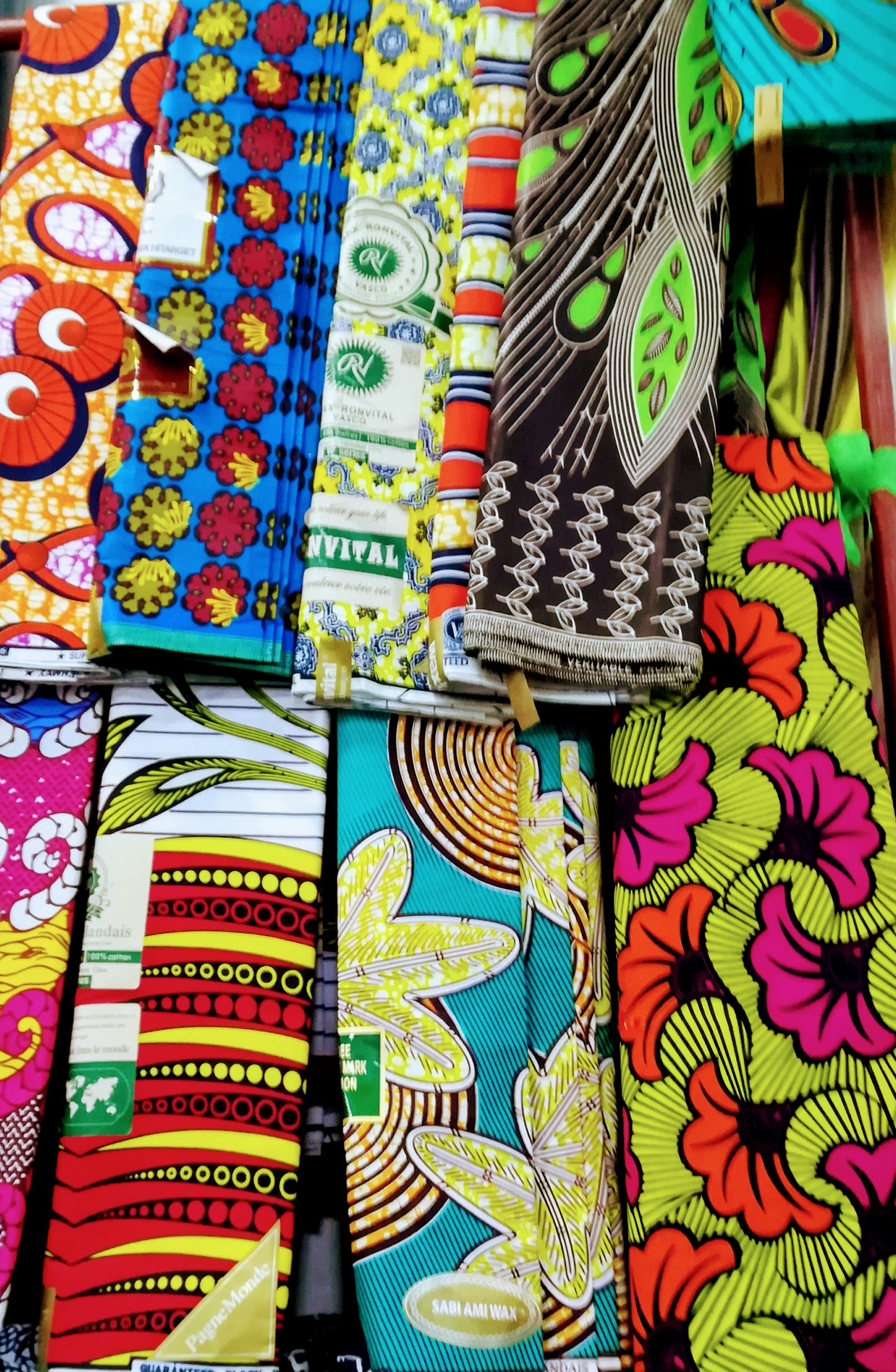
Contemporary West African textile designs

African textiles are textiles from the various peoples, cultures, and locations of the African continent. These are produced in many distinctive styles; using varied fabrics, dyeing methods, manufacturing techniques, and technologies; and for myriad ritual, decorative, and functional ends. These textiles hold cultural significance and also are important historical documents of African design.

Textiles were historically produced and used in every major region of Africa; however, archaeological finds of historic textiles in Africa are frequently described as "exceptional" due to the frequent degradation of such organic artifacts in tropical, temperate, and even semi-arid environments.

Nonetheless, textiles of notable antiquity have been found in Africa, including a flax fragment found at the site of Upper K, Fayyum region, Egypt, which has been dated to the neolithic period of Ancient Egyptian history, also called the Pre-dynastic period; a cotton textile fragment at a site near Aksum, Ethiopia, dating to the late fifth or early sixth centuries AD; and a wool textile fragment found at the site of Kissi, Burkina Faso, dating to the early sixth century AD.

== History ==
Some of the oldest surviving African textiles were discovered at the archaeological site of Kissi in northern Burkina Faso. They are made of wool or fine "short" animal hair including dried skin for integrity. Some fragments have also survived from the thirteenth century Benin City in Nigeria. Historically textiles were used as a form of currency since the fourteenth century in West Africa and Central Africa. Below is an overview of some of the common techniques and textile materials used in various African regions and countries.

=== Textile weaving ===
Stripweaving, a centuries-old textile manufacturing technique of creating cloth by weaving strips together, is characteristic of weaving in West Africa, who credit Mande weavers and in particular the Tellem people as the first to master the art of weaving complex weft patterns into strips. Findings from caves at Bandiagara Escarpment in Mali propose its use from as far back as the 11th century. Stripwoven cloths are made up of narrow strips that are cut into desired lengths and sewn together. From Mali, the technique spread across West Africa to Ivory Coast, Ghana, and Nigeria. Raffia fiber from dried stripped leaves of raffia palm was commonly used in West Africa and Central Africa for raffia cloth since it is widely available in countries with grasslands like Cameroon, Ghana, and Nigeria. Cotton fibers from the kapok tree has been extensively used by the Dagomba to produce long strips of fibre to make the Ghanaian smock. Other fiber materials included undyed wild silk used in Nigeria for embroidery and weaving, as well as barkcloth from fig trees used to make clothes for ceremonial occasions in Uganda, Cameroon, and the Congo. Over time most of these fibers were replaced with cotton. Textiles were woven on horizontal or vertical looms with variations depending on the region.

- Horizontal looms: include single heddle looms, double heddle frame looms with foot treadles, and horizontal pit-treadle looms. However, there are many variations, for example, the Yoruba. In Nigeria use single heddle looms with extra string heddles but Kuba raffia weavers set the heddles at 45 degrees. Double heddle frames are used by Asante silk weavers, Ewe and Cameroonian cotton weavers, and the Djerma weavers in Niger and Burkina Faso. While the Amhara in Ethiopia use double headle pit-treadle looms, where the weaver sits on the edge of a small pit dug in the ground.
- Vertical looms: Berbers in North Africa and the Yoruba in Nigeria used broad, upright vertical looms to weave cotton cloth while single heddle vertical looms are used in Cameroon and the Congo. Portable tripod looms used by Mande weavers are today unique to Sierra Leone and Liberia.

==== West Africa ====
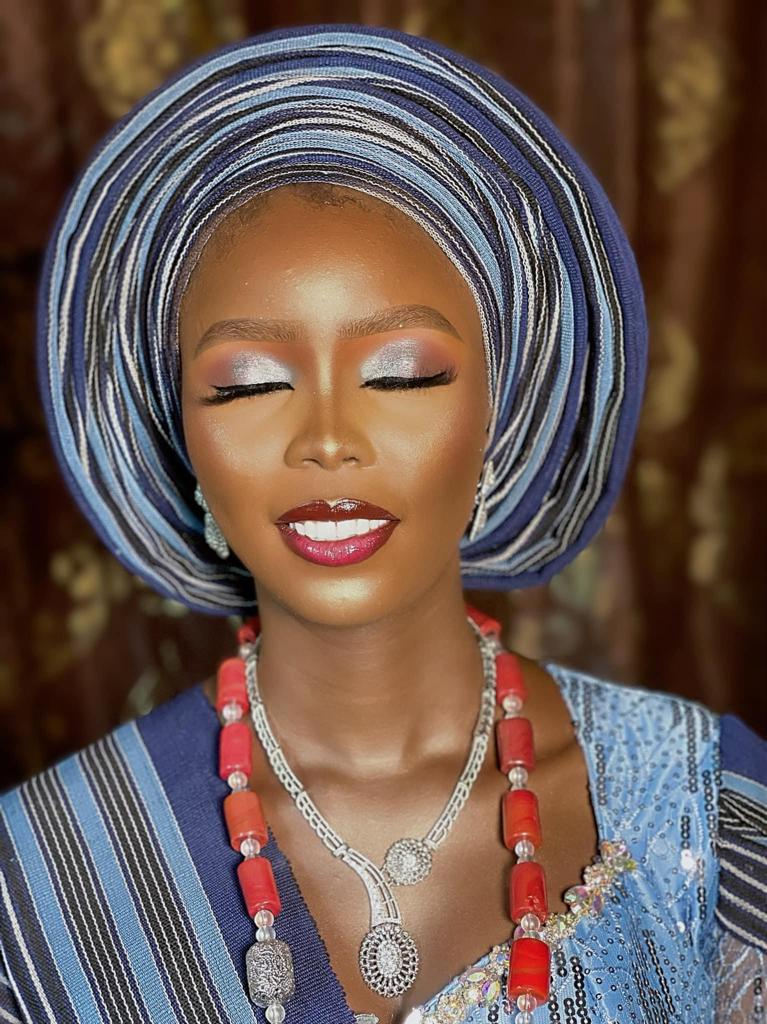
Yoruba Woman in Aso oke

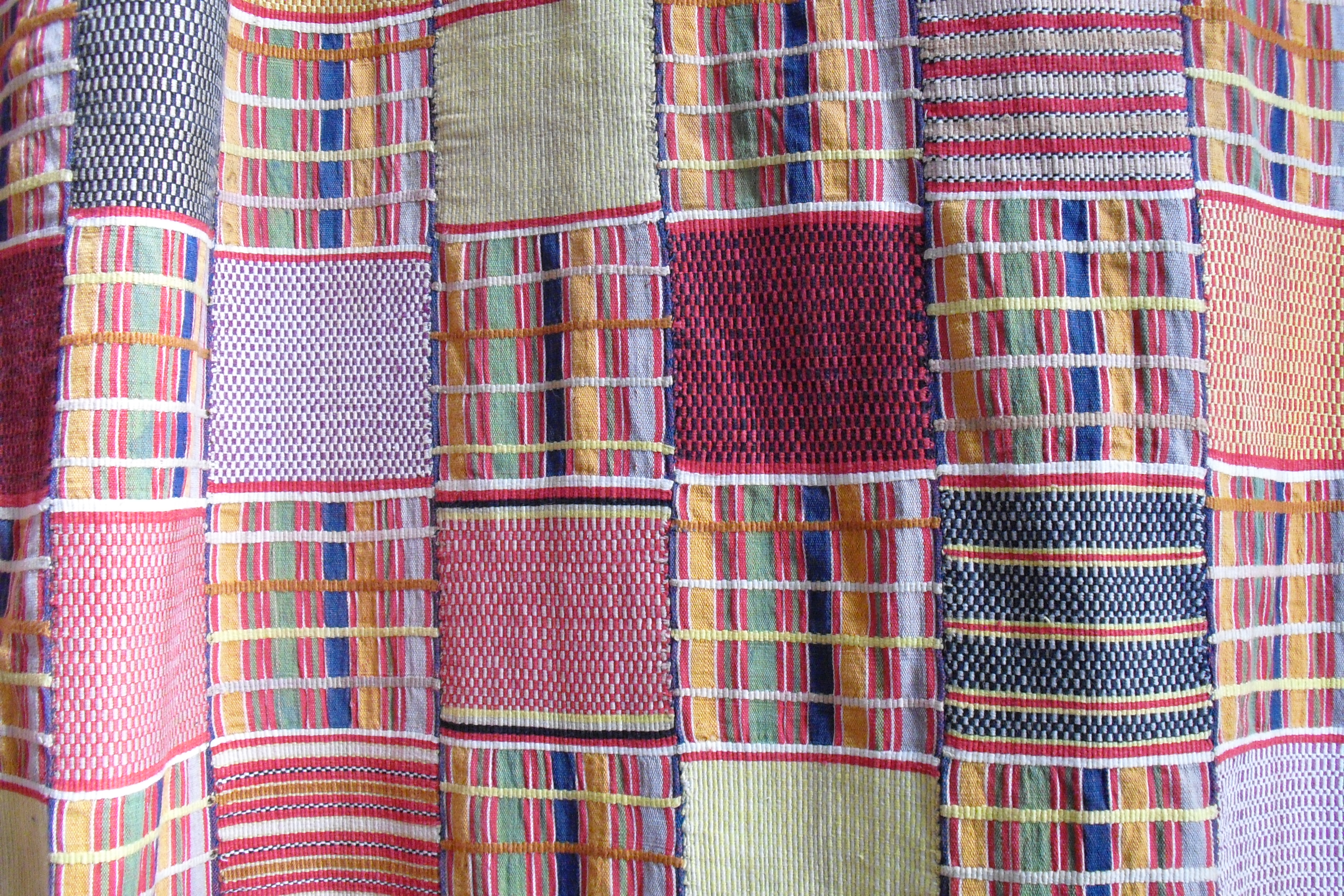
Ewe Kente

- Asante Kente: The Asante were the dominant people of West Africa's Gold Coast, present-day Ghana. Controlling the only source of gold available, the Asante traded with other African states and later with Europeans after contact with the Portuguese in the 15th century. With their wealth and a rich source of gold, they made all forms of jewelry, amulets, and talismans from the gold. In the 18th century, the Asante acquired knowledge of the strip weaving technique from Bondoukou through trade that is seen in the present-day Ivory Coast. The Asante became respected for strip-weaving Kente cloths in cotton and silk in the weaving village of Bonwire. The term Kente means basket and refers to the checkerboard pattern of the cloths. The cotton for early Kente was locally grown, but the silk was imported since silk moths are not indigenous to Ghana. In present day, Kente is found worn across the population; however, its use is still concentrated among high society members and the wealthy. This stems from its long history of association with Asante royalty, who had also used it to denote their spiritual power, documented through later findings in their shrines to deities.
- Kyekye of the Bondoukou people: Kyekye is a fabric originating from the Bondoukou people of Ivory Coast, and is often woven in a geometric pattern with blue indigo dye serving as the primary color scheme. The kyekye also predates the Akan Kente fabric, influencing its subsequent development.
- Ewe Kente: Kente cloth is also worn by the Ewe, located in Ghana and Togo and Benin Republic. The Ewe, a Gbe speaking group who originated from Nigeria, had a tradition of horizontal loom weaving, adopted the double heddle frame loom style of Kente cloth weaving from the Asante with some important differences. Ewes weave cotton cloth instead of silk or rayon and introduce floating figurative weft patterns representing proverbs. Also, since the Ewe were not centralized, Kente was not limited to use by royalty, though the cloth was still associated with prestige and special occasions. A greater variety in the patterns and functions exist in Ewe Kente, and the symbolism of the patterns often has more to do with daily life than with social standing or wealth.
- Dagbon: The people are specialised in weaving the Chinchini. This African textile is used to weave the Ghanaian Smock. Queens, princesses and women of Dagbon wear the Chinchini. The weaving of the chinchini is done by the 'Kpaluu', one of the traditional professional in the Dagbon society that has existed until today. The smock made from the Chinchini of Dagbon is the most worn traditional cloth of Ghana.During, the declaration of independence from colonial rule, Ghana's first prime minister and president together with other members of The Big Six (Ghana) were dressed in smocks as they declared the attainment of independence by the Ghanaian people. In November 2022, Ghana's Men National Football Team were dressed on beautiful patterns of smocks made from the chinchini as they arrived in Qatar. The smocks, although originated from Northern Ghana, is worn by all across West Africa.
- Yoruba Aso Oke: Aso oke meaning 'country cloth', is the most prestigious hand-woven cloth of the Yoruba. It requires a level of expertise and time to weave the cloth. Traditional indigo-colored Aso oke often required the hand-spun thread to be dyed up to fourteen times to achieve the deep blues needed. Special techniques were used to make the threads colorfast so that they would not damage the lighter colored threads or embroidery when washed. The raw silk used in Aso oke, called sanyan, requires thousands of moth cocoons to be collected and their silk carefully unraveled and spun into thread. These types of labor-intensive activities were prerequisites to weaving and hand embroidering. Technically, Aso oke is what is known as a double-heddle narrow loom weave. The cloth is made by weaving a four-inch band of cloth measuring forty feet or more. This long piece is then taken to a tailor who cuts it into pieces, sews it together, and sometimes hand-embroiders it. Traditionally, Aso oke was woven from cotton and imported or domestic silk. Aso oke outfits are worn during major ceremonies such as weddings, funerals, naming ceremonies, and important religious festivals.
- Faso Dan Fani: produced in Burkina Faso by the Marka people, the name is Dyula for "woven cloth of the motherland." Woven from cotton, kapok and tuntun wild silk, the thread is handspun, dyed, and woven on double-heddle looms into striped cloth: women spin and dye, while men weave and sew. The stripes of each cloth are woven to correspond to a proverb. Thus, wearing the cloth conveys a message. Thomas Sankara (president from 1983 until his assassination in 1987) promoted dan fani as a symbol of local arts and national pride, and encouraged its wearing as an alternative to the Western suit. It also diverted cotton production from a raw material for export to being used for domestic consumption. Sankara said, "We should not be slave of what others produce […] wearing the Faso Dan Fani is an economic act, cultural, and political to challenge imperialism." With Sankara returning to popularity in the 2010s, Faso Dan Fani has also become more popular in Burkina Faso and in West Africa in general.

==== East Africa ====
- Ethiopian Cotton: With the exception of Ethiopia, textile weaving is less common in East Africa. Cotton grows abundantly in Ethiopia and Sudan, with Sudan being one of the first cotton weaving locations in the world. Ethiopia has conditions that are good for growing cotton thus cotton was then locally grown and woven into cotton fabric on horizontal pit-looms mainly used by those with high social status. Embroidery is done by hand traditionally, and is originally the job of the men.
- Ugandan barkcloth: barkcloth in Uganda is traditionally made with the ficus natalensis plant and is harvested during the wet season. Afterwards, it is beaten laboriously until it develops a soft texture, in which then the fabric can be woven to satisfy the desired purpose.

==== Central Africa ====
- Kuba raffia: The Kuba of Central Africa have one of the widest range of textile skills in Africa including weaving cloth from leaves of raffia palm as well as embroidery, applique, cut-pile and resist dyeing techniques. The Kuba kingdom's need for traditional textiles for ceremonies has sustained their traditional cloth and weaving techniques since the height of the kingdom between the 17th and 19th century until today. Unlike in other regions in Africa where over time locally grown and homespun materials were replaced by mill spun and synthetic fabrics, the Kuba raffia looms could not be adapted for weaving cotton or other fibers; thus helping to retain traditional skills. raffia is one of the most important indigenous fibres used in Central Africa including Cameroon, Republic of Congo and the Democratic Republic of Congo. It grows in abundance and sustainably in the swampy lands. To make cloth raffia fabric, fibres from raffia palm trees are harvested, the upper skin is stripped and left to dry in the sun. The fibre is then woven into skirts and wraps. raffia weaving is also concentrated in the eastern part of Madagascar where contemporary haklkat raffia wraps are tie-dyed with multiple colors.
- Bark cloth: Bark cloth has ceremonial and ritual importance for the Baganda in Uganda as well as in Cameroon and the Congo. It is one of the first fabrics made in tropical areas of Sub-saharan Africa, specifically Central Africa. Bark from the tropical fig tree is stripped from the tree once a year and then sustainably regrows. The bark is moistened and then beaten rhythmically over a log until it expands by as much as four times into cloth. The cloth is then decorated with embroidery or dyed to create embroidered gowns, crocheted feathered hats, or the popular Bamileke stitched resist bark cloth.

==== Southern Africa ====
- Malagasy Silk: The island of Madagascar lies off the southeast coast of Africa, separated from the mainland by the Mozambique Channel. Malaysian Polynesians arrived at the east African coast in the first millennium and intermixed with the local Bantu people, creating the Malagasy people who would settle the Island of Madagascar. They subsequently brought weaving techniques and burial customs to the island through trade. Cotton is grown all over the island but the most prestigious material is silk. There are 13 known varieties of locally grown silk. The silk is long and woven on a single heddle loom.
- Zimbabwe: Gudza fabric comes from Chimanimani area in the Eastern Highlands of Zimbabwe. Gudza is twisted fiber from the inner tree bark. Different sources list this as being Musasa/Munondo (Brachystegia / Julbernardiaspp) tree or the baobab tree (Adansonia digitata). The bark fibers are soaked to soften it before being woven. Traditionally it is chewed to make them even suppler before being dyed and woven.

==== North Africa ====
- In Egypt, woven tapestries called kilim have been used as rugs since at least the 5th century. The craft is still popular today throughout Africa and Asia and often used as prayer rugs.
- The middle Nile basin in Sudan was one of the first locations in the world to domesticate and weave cotton, with some scholars such as the late Dr. Christopher Ehret arguing that they were the first in the world to weave cotton.

=== Dyeing ===
Dyeing is the main method of colouring fabrics. From the Tuareg nomads of the Sahara to Cameroon in central Africa, clothes dyed with indigo, the most common dye in West Africa, signified wealth and abundance. The Yoruba of Nigeria and the Mandinka of Mali are recognized as experts in indigo dyeing. Natural dyes such as vegetable and mineral dyes were widely used including blue from indigo which is obtained from a stream that runs from the Senegal River down to the Cameron border rich in Lonchocarpus cyanescens( a species of shrub from family Fabaceae. It is commonly known as elu in Yoruba, anunu by Igbo people as talaki in Hausa, sauru in Tiv and as ebelu by the Edo people) the main plant for indigo dyeing. Other natural dyes include Morinda brimstone tree for yellow, white from kaolin clay, black from charcoal or black clay, brown from mud, and red from Camwood. Some dyes like camwood need to be heated before use. The camwood is grated into a powder, then boiled before adding the fiber to be dyed. However, other dyes like the Kola nut do not need heat. Resist techniques such as tie-dye, stitched and folded resist, wax batik, and starch resist are typical dyeing methods used to introduce patterns and color on the cloth.

==== West Africa ====
- Senegal: Stitch resist dyeing entails stitching the cloth to prevent the dye from reaching selected areas on the cloth. The stitching was historically done by hand but now also by sewing machines. The finest stitch resist indigo dyed materials are the Saint Louis textiles of Senegal. Manjak weavers produce the most widely used woven fabric in Senegal.
- Nigeria: Among the Hausa, indigo dyeing generated wealth in ancient Kano. Igbo people produces Akwete cloth, a handwoven textile made on vertical loom with cotton, rafia or other fibres. Yoruba, the indigo-dyeing process, using a stitch resist method to make Adire Alabere.
- Mali: Traditional mudcloth followed a specific method using weave, dye, and local mud. Desired patterns were a result of repetition of processes over time.
- Ghana: Adinkra symbols representing proverbs and aphorisms were stenciled on fabric using carved calabash stamps and a vegetable-based dye to make Adinkra cloths traditionally worn by royalty and spiritual leaders. Adinkra cloths originated from the Bono Akan tribe of Ghana.

==== Central Africa ====
- Cameroon: Indigo dyeing in Cameroon is also done in pits very similar to technique practiced in neighbouring Nigeria. To make resist-stitched, Bamileke indigo-dyed cloth, the geometric designs are stitched onto cotton cloth with a raffia thread. The stitched cloth is then dyed blue in dye-pits using indigo which traditionally was natural but has now been replaced with synthetic versions. The raffia stitches are then removed from the dyed cloth to reveal the pattern of white resist against a blue background. The patterns used range from geometric tribal motifs to figurative patterns of humans and animals. Clamp resist dyeing is used by the Kuba. raffia panels are folded to form a cube and then clamped and dip dyed. The clamps are removed after dyeing to reveal the resist pattern in natural raffia against the usually black dyed background.

==== Southern Africa ====
- Zimbabwe: Batiks are created using maize flour paste. In eastern Zimbabwe, a long tradition of making sturdy naturally-coloured mats from bark fiber exists.

=== Decoration: embroidery and beadwork ===
Embroidery was used for both decorative and functional purposes. The embroidery techniques, such as buttonhole stitch and cut-pile embroidery, are often simple, but their intricate effects are a result of the skill-level and final pattern design used. For example, hemmed appliqué is a simple technique still used today where raffia cloth pieces are cut into designs and sewn onto the base fabric. The decorative pattern depends on the region and the imagination of the embroiderer. The Asante in Ghana use non-figurative patterns representing proverbs while the Ewes use figurative weft patterns also representing proverbs. The Yoruba introduce rows of holes lengthwise in the woven cloth strip. Beadwork is common in East Africa and Southern Africa although it is still used in other parts of Africa including Nigeria and Ethiopia.

- West Africa: In Nigeria Hausa, Nupe and Yoruba have variable embroidery used on their flowing gowns. Yoruba Agbada robes have its form if embroidery. Ghana's Asafo, military organizations that existed as early as the late 1400s, balanced the political power of paramount chiefs and are most highly developed among the Fante with a typical town having two to 14 companies. Each company has its own name, number, regalia, and shrine. A company is led by a senior commander, captains of subdivisions, and various other officials, including linguists, flag bearers, priests, and priestesses. The Frankaa is the Flag of a Fante Asafo company. The block-colored patchwork design on the Frankaa alludes to proverbs, depicts historical events, or asserts the wealth and power of the Asafo company that manufactured it. Appliqué and embroidery appear on both sides of the flag. In the 19th century, Yoruba carvers and crown makers would assemble regalia using beads. The Yoruba people independently created various glass and coral beads in the ancient times.
- East Africa: Ethiopia has two traditions of embroidery: Amhara embroidery the locals call "tilf" on traditional cotton fabrics such as "menen", and the Muslim style originally centered in the city of Harar and influenced by Indian and Arabian embroidery patterns. Amhara embroidery is typically sewn on a handwoven undyed cotton chemise and the embroidery is at the neck, cuffs, and hem. The embroidery itself is made of cotton or silver beads. The Maasai, based in the Great Rift Valley of Kenya and Tanzania, started decorating their leather with beads mainly in the 19th century, although beading has been practice in Africa as a whole for tens of thousands of years. The beads and shells were also used to make jewelry and to decorate masks, ceremonial dresses, and costumes.
- Central Africa: Raffia weaving, embroidered gowns, crocheted gowns, and feathered hats are all unique to the country of Cameroon. The Kuba use applique to strengthen the raffia cloth used for skirts. Since the raffia is rough, it is typically washed and pounded to soften it. This weakens the fibers and creates holes. Decorative appliques are used to cover up the holes.
- Southern Africa: Beadwork by the Xhosa, Zulu, Ndebele, and Basotho has been documented. Historically garments were decorated from natural materials such as ostrich shells. It was only in the 1930s that the Portuguese introduced glass beads through trade and eventually the glass beads purchased from Indian merchants or Christian missionaries. In Xhosa culture, beads represent the society's organizational framework and the rites of passage that people have gone through. Symbolic references are drawn from the beads through the color, pattern, formation, and motifs. Motifs on the beads often used include trees, diamonds, quadrangles, chevrons, triangles, circles and parallel lines that form a pattern exclusive to certain age groups. Brick stitch is the most common technique for creating Zulu beadwork. Beads are staggered in rows and as each new bead is threaded, the thread passes under a loop of thread on the previous row and back. This gives Zulu beadwork characteristic traits. The Zulus favor motifs made up of triangles and diagonal and horizontal lines.

== Cultural significance ==
Weaving is of great importance in many African cultures. The Dogon, for example, believe that spinning and weaving thread can be likened to human reproduction and the notion of rebirth. The color of cloth is often of significance and is representative of specific qualities and attributes. For example, among the Ewe and Ashanti, black and white Kente cloth is typically worn at funerals of elderly people to signify both a celebration of life and the mourning of death. In most cases end up with a widow wearing her late husband's apparel for several days.

African textiles can be used as historical documents. cloth can be used to commemorate a certain person, event, and even a political cause. Much of the history conveyed had more to do with how others impacted the African people, rather than about the African people themselves. The tapestries tell stories of Roman and Arab invasions, and how the impact of Islam and Christianity affected African life. The same is true of major events such as colonialism, the African Slave Trade, even the Cold War.

African textiles also have significance as historical documents, offering perspectives in cases where written historical accounts are unavailable: "History in Africa may be read, told and recorded in cloth."

Western African demand for cotton textiles fueled early South-South exchange during colonial times.

== Examples ==
Some examples of African textiles are the following:

- Aso oke fabric – woven by Yoruba people
- Adire – tie-dye produced by Yoruba people
- Aso olona - Woven by Yoruba People
- Souban cloth – woven by Zarma people
- Ankara or African Wax Prints
- Bazin (fabric), produced in Mali
- Akwete cloth – woven by Igbo people
- Barkcloth – produced by the Buganda tribe
- Bògòlanfini – produced by the Bambara tribe
- Cape Wool is African wool.
- Chitenge – produced in Zambia
- Kanga – produced in Tanzania
- Kente cloth – woven by Ashanti and Ewe people
- Kitenge – produced in Tanzania and other regions of East Africa
- Kongo textiles – produced by the Kongo
- Kuba textiles – produced by the Kuba
- Seghosen - Woven by Yoruba People
- Shweshwe – produced in South Africa
- Ukara – dyed indigo cloth by Igbo people
