= Woolmark =

Trademark indicating 100% pure new wool

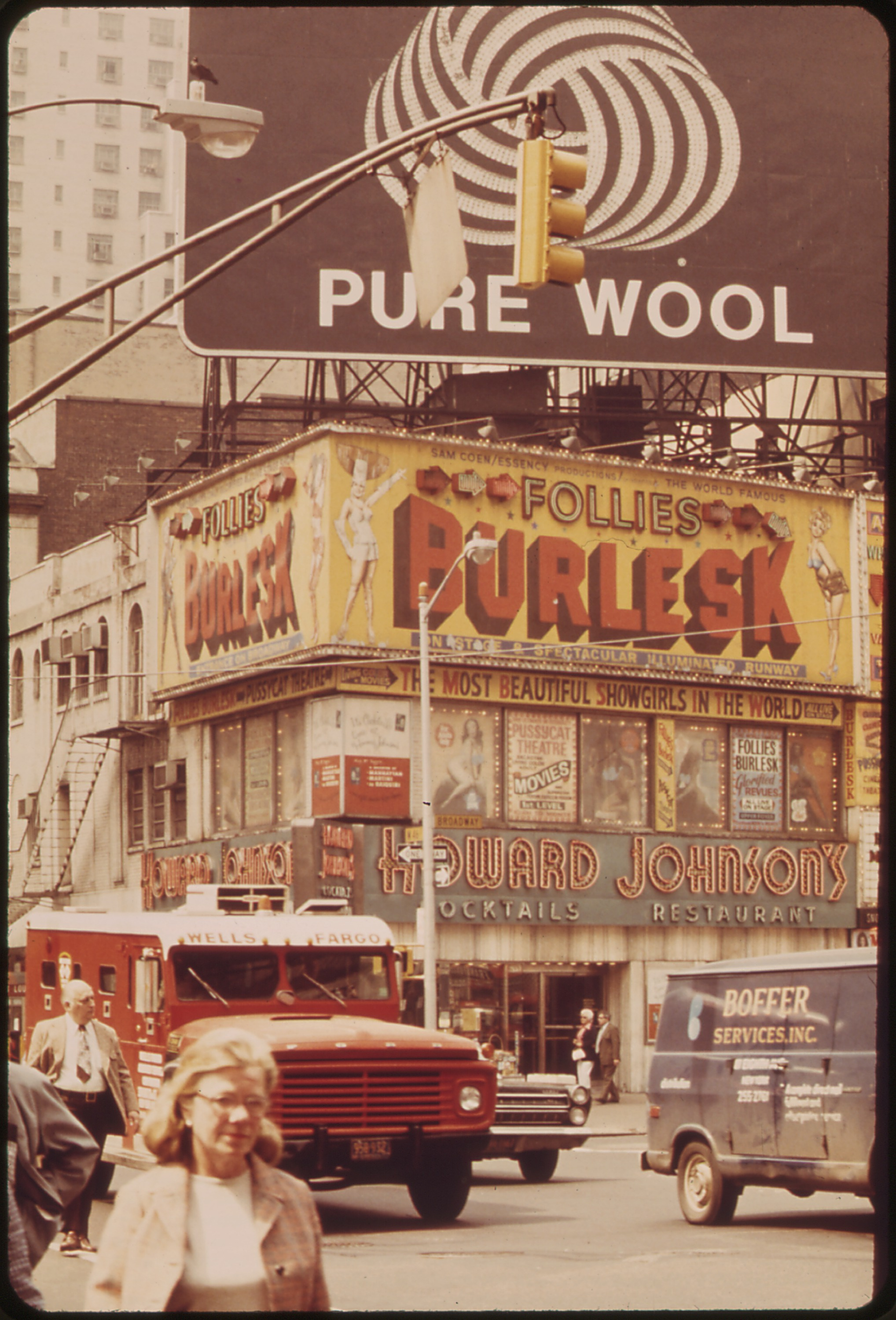
Street scene in Midtown Manhattan in 1973, with a large rooftop billboard for "Pure Wool" and the Woolmark

Woolmark is a wool industry certification mark used on pure wool products that meet quality standards set by The Woolmark Company. It is a trade mark owned by The Woolmark Company, which has since 2007 been a subsidiary of Australian Wool Innovation Limited (AWI). The logo was launched in 1964 by the Woolmark Company under its previous name, the International Wool Secretariat.

== History ==
The Woolmark logo was developed by the International Wool Secretariat (IWS), which had been founded in 1937. The logo was launched in August 1964 by IWS, then under the control of two Australians, chairman William Archer (Bill) Gunn (1914-2003) and William Vines (1916-2011) as managing director.

The two main objectives of the logo were to position wool at the top of the textile market and to ensure that products bearing the Woolmark label were made from pure new wool and not blended with synthetic fibres. The logo had been selected by IWS following a competition in 1963 won by Milanese graphic artist Francesco Saroglia (most probably a pseudonym of Italian architect, graphic designer Franco Grignani).

The logo was originally owned by IWS, which in 1997 changed its name to The Woolmark Company Pty Ltd. The Woolmark Company Pty Ltd and Australian Wool Innovation Limited (AWI) were subsidiaries of the Australian Wool Research and Promotion Organisation, which was succeeded by Australian Wool Services Limited (AWS). AWI was de-merged from AWS in 2002 and The Woolmark Company was sold by AWS to AWI in 2007. Since 2007, the Woolmark Company has been a subsidiary of AWI, a nonprofit organization that conducts research, development and marketing along the global supply chain for Australian wool on behalf of approximately 60,000 woolgrowers that cooperatively fund the company. What remained of AWS became Graziers’ Investment Company Limited, which as of March 2020 was in the process of liquidation.

The logo has been such a success that it eventually ranked with a large scallop shell or three-pointed-star in terms of consumer recognition and understanding. In 2011, British design magazine, Creative Review, declared the Woolmark number one of the top twenty logos of all time.

== Licensing ==
AWI licenses the Woolmark trade mark to be used by affiliated vendors on their products as a certification mark that the product conforms to the standards set by AWI. AWI claims that the mark is employed on textile products as an assurance that the product is made of 100% pure new wool. It signifies the brand of wool.
