= Souban cloth =

Hand woven textile produced by the Zarma people

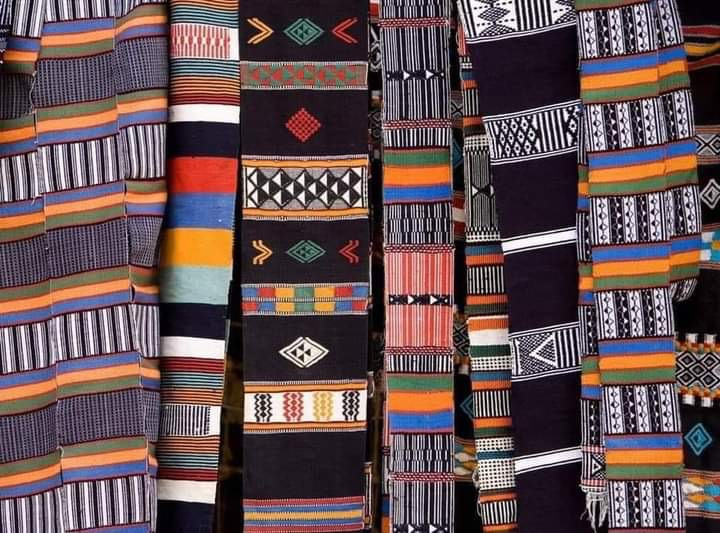
Souban stripes

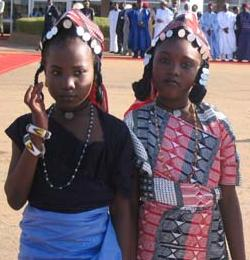
Zarma girl on the right wearing Souban

Souban, or Tera Tera, is a handwoven cloth originating from the Zarma people of Niger. Alternative names include “Soubane taafa” meaning “Souban cloth”, and “Djerma cloth”. It is made by traditional weavers called "tchakey" with wool and cotton. Historically, the loincloth came in two colors, black and white, but contemporary versions showcase vibrant hues and geometric patterns, each carrying special symbolic meaning. The intricate designs depict aspects of daily life, reflecting the community's joys and prosperity.

== History ==
West African cultures have been weaving textiles for thousands of years. Utilized by the Songhai-Zarma community, the traditional loincloth known as Souban is a handwoven fabric dating back to the 15th century. This cultural symbol of the Zarma people is crafted by local weavers called "Tchakey," who are categorized into two groups. The massaki-sakala weaves "Dori" and "Dosso" blankets with five strips of 8 cm width, while the "massaki-tera" weaves "Souban" blankets consisting of 12/17 strips of the same width. In the history of Niger’s textile industry, the tchakey holds significant importance in the community.

Historically, the loincloth came in two colors, black and white, but contemporary versions showcase vibrant hues and geometric patterns, each carrying special symbolic meaning. The intricate designs depict aspects of daily life, reflecting the community's joys and prosperity.

== Use ==
Produced over months by a skilled Tchakey, the opulent fabric was sought after by noble families, adorning themselves with it during special occasion. It was considered a symbol of good grace. In the past, families had their own weavers and all the Souban that the family wore were woven by the family weaver. Additionally, the Souban woven blanket is used in wrapping newlyweds during marriage ceremonies, symbolizing a future filled with fortune, abundance, and happiness.

In Zarma-Songhai tradition, brides have traditionally been ritually draped in the Souban as they set forth on their journey to their husband's residence. Before the wedding day, the bride's mother establishes a bond with a proficient weaver, choosing them based on their artistic skill and ability to create the desired detailed patterns. Among those who can afford it, it is a customary practice for the bride's mother to acquire two Soubans—one for the bride and another for the groom.

== Gallery ==
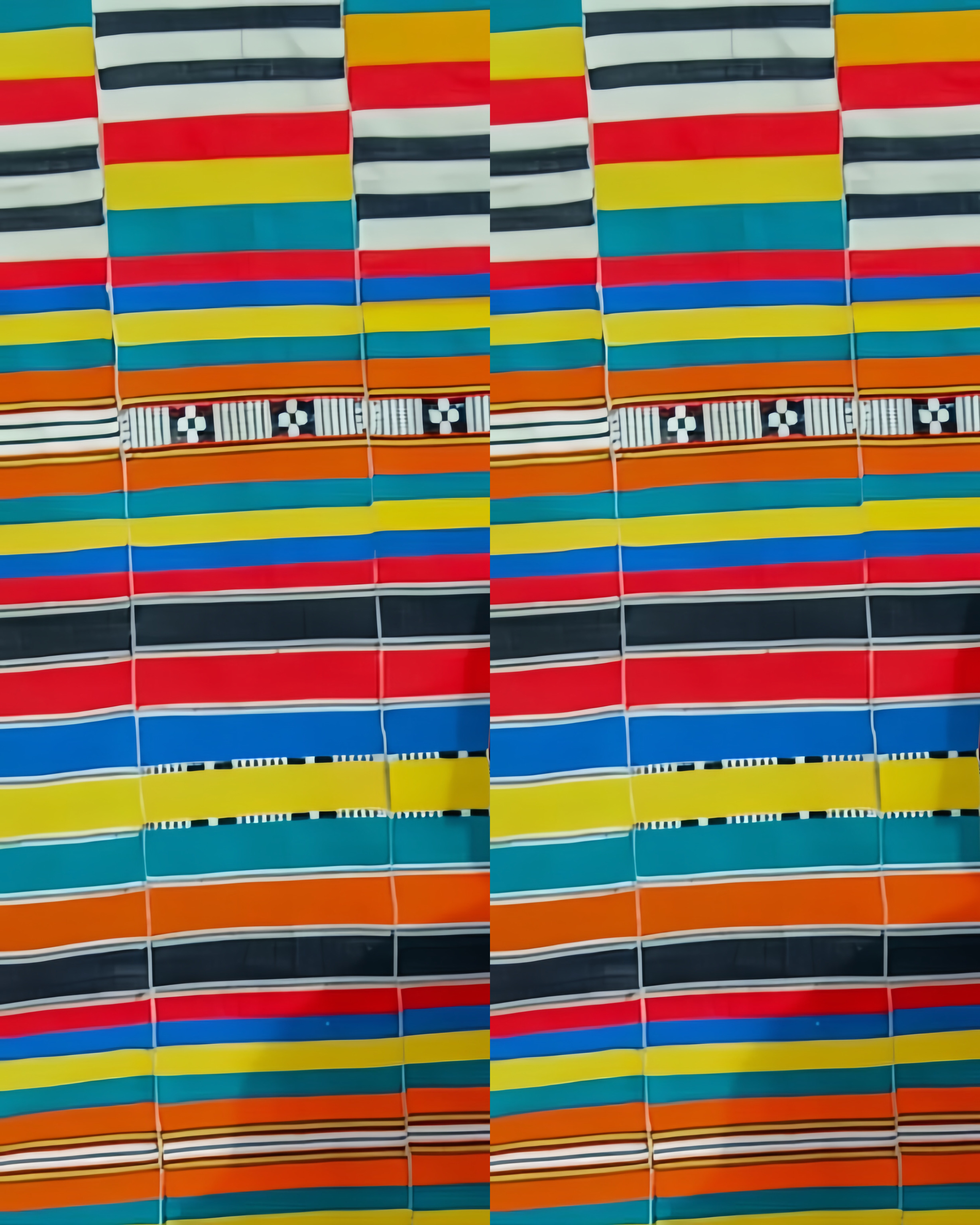

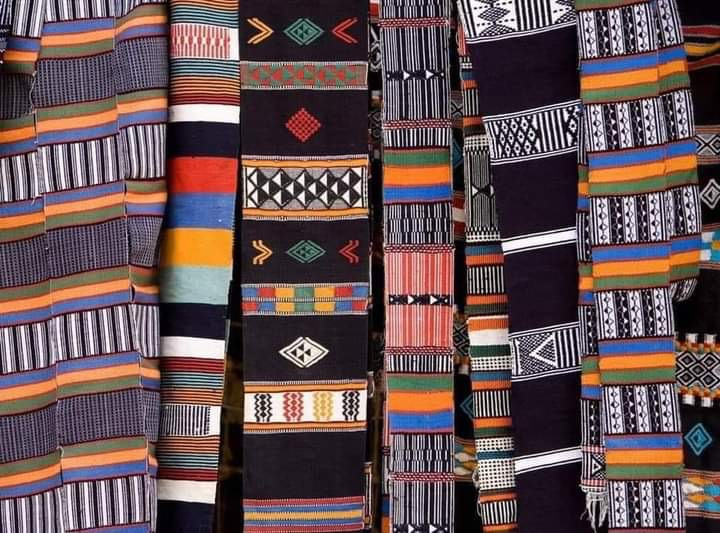

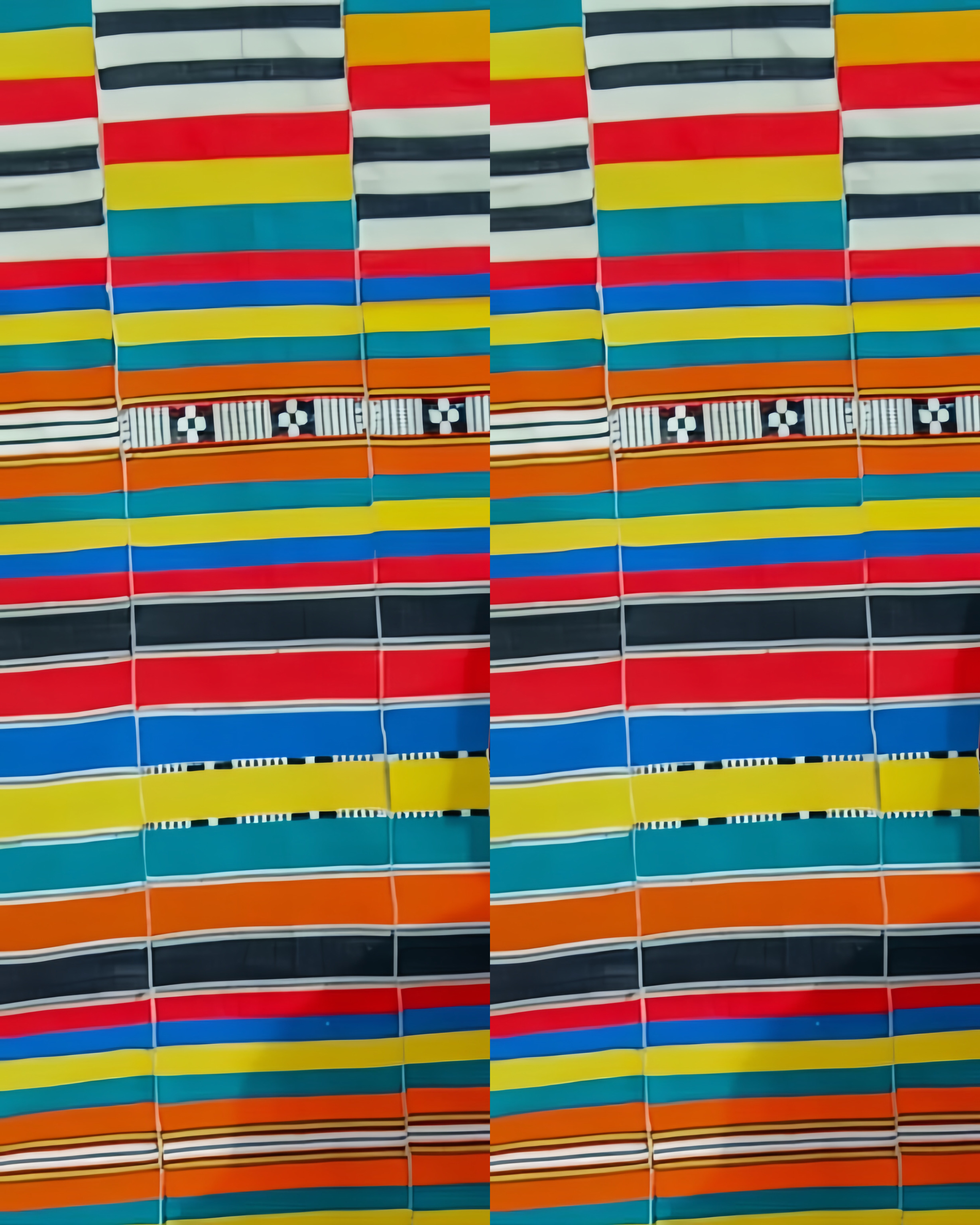

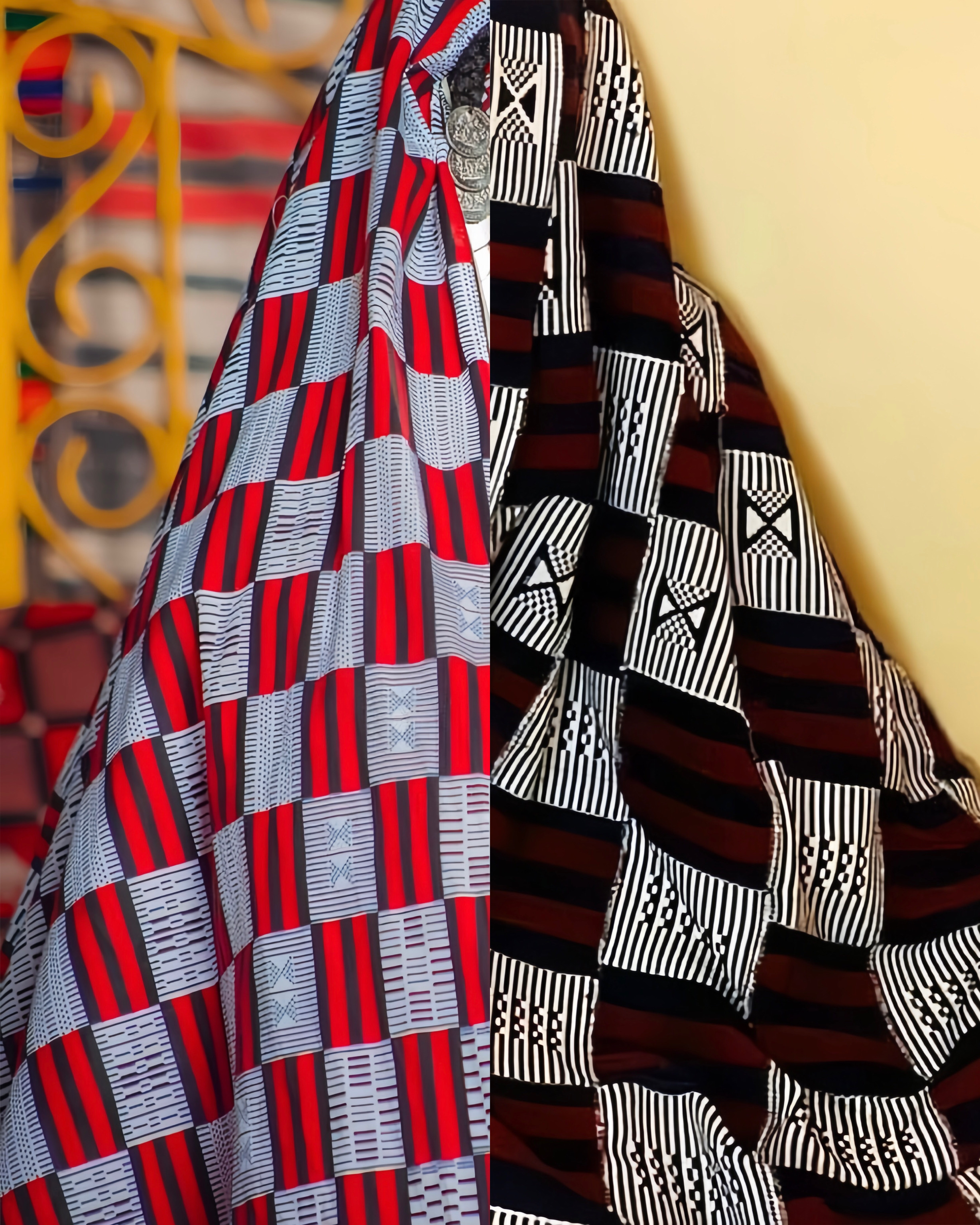

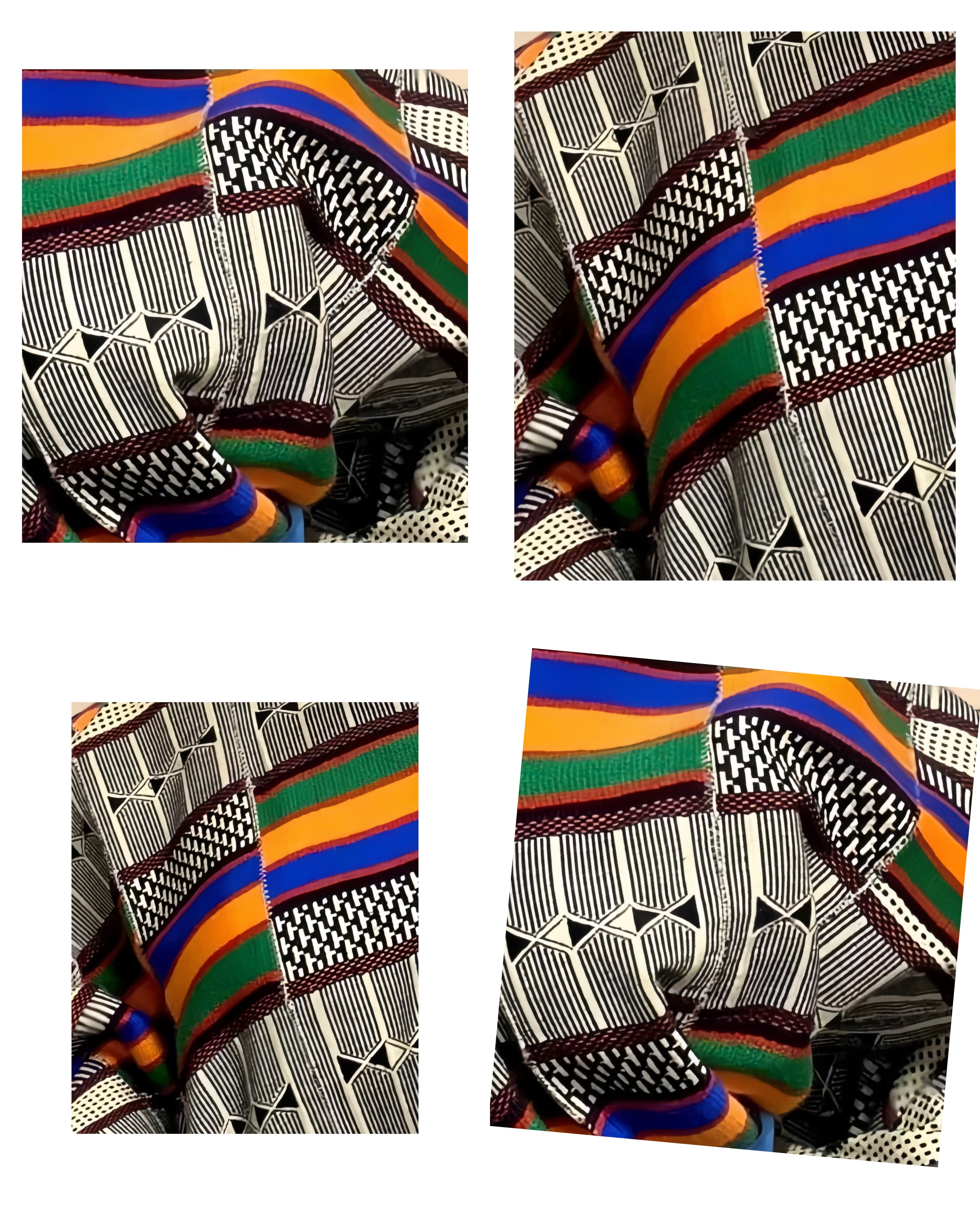

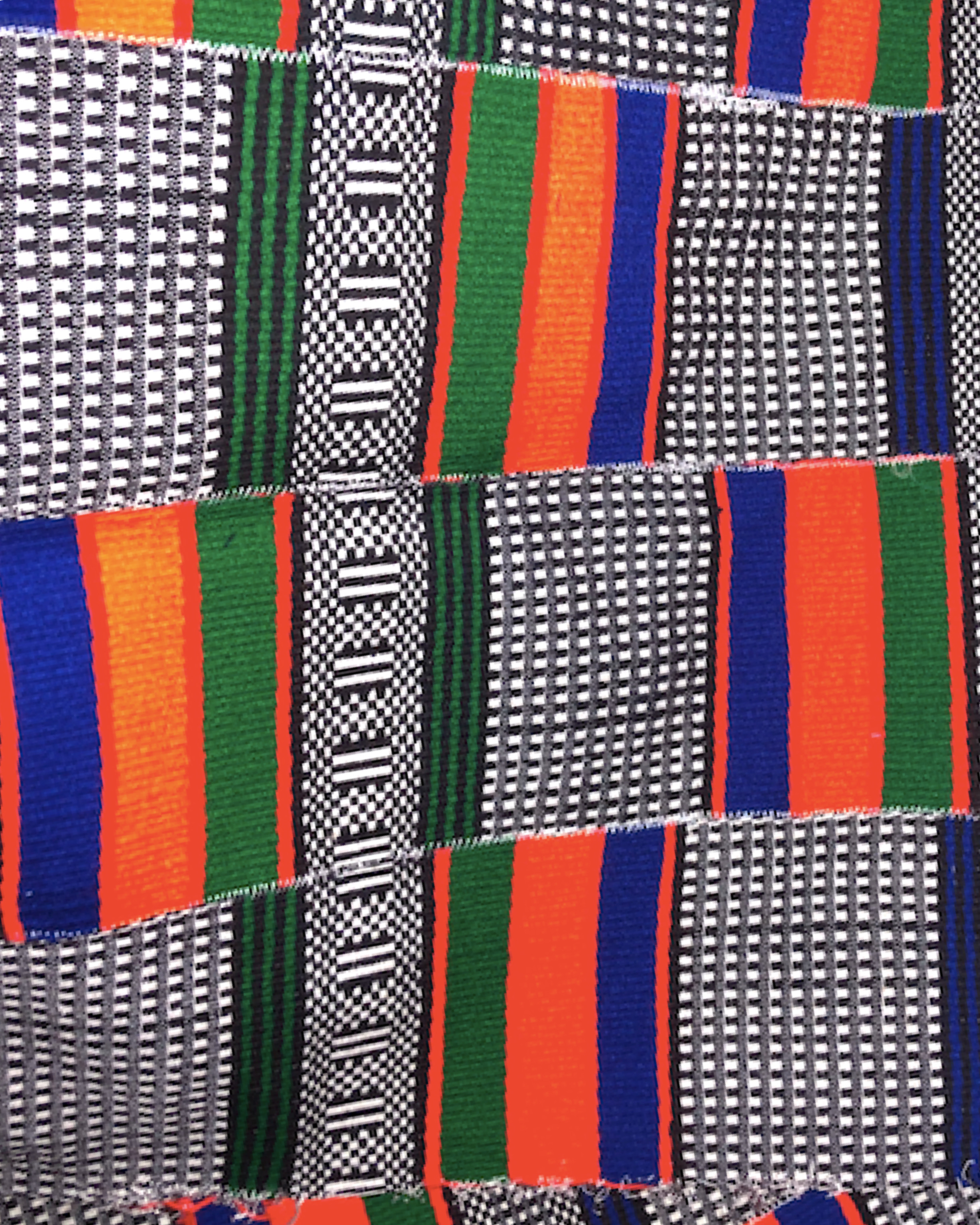

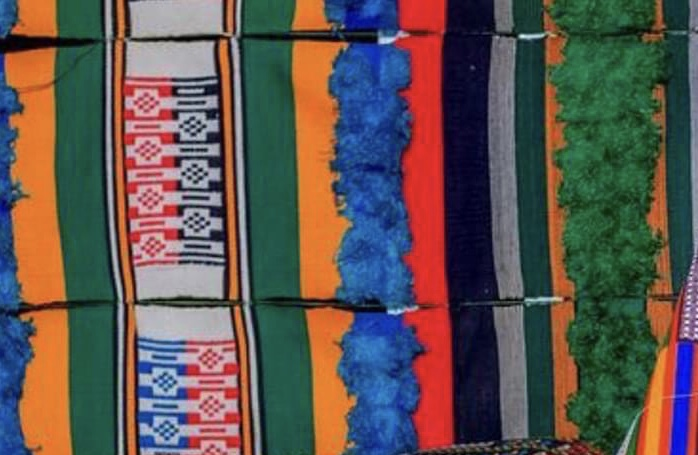

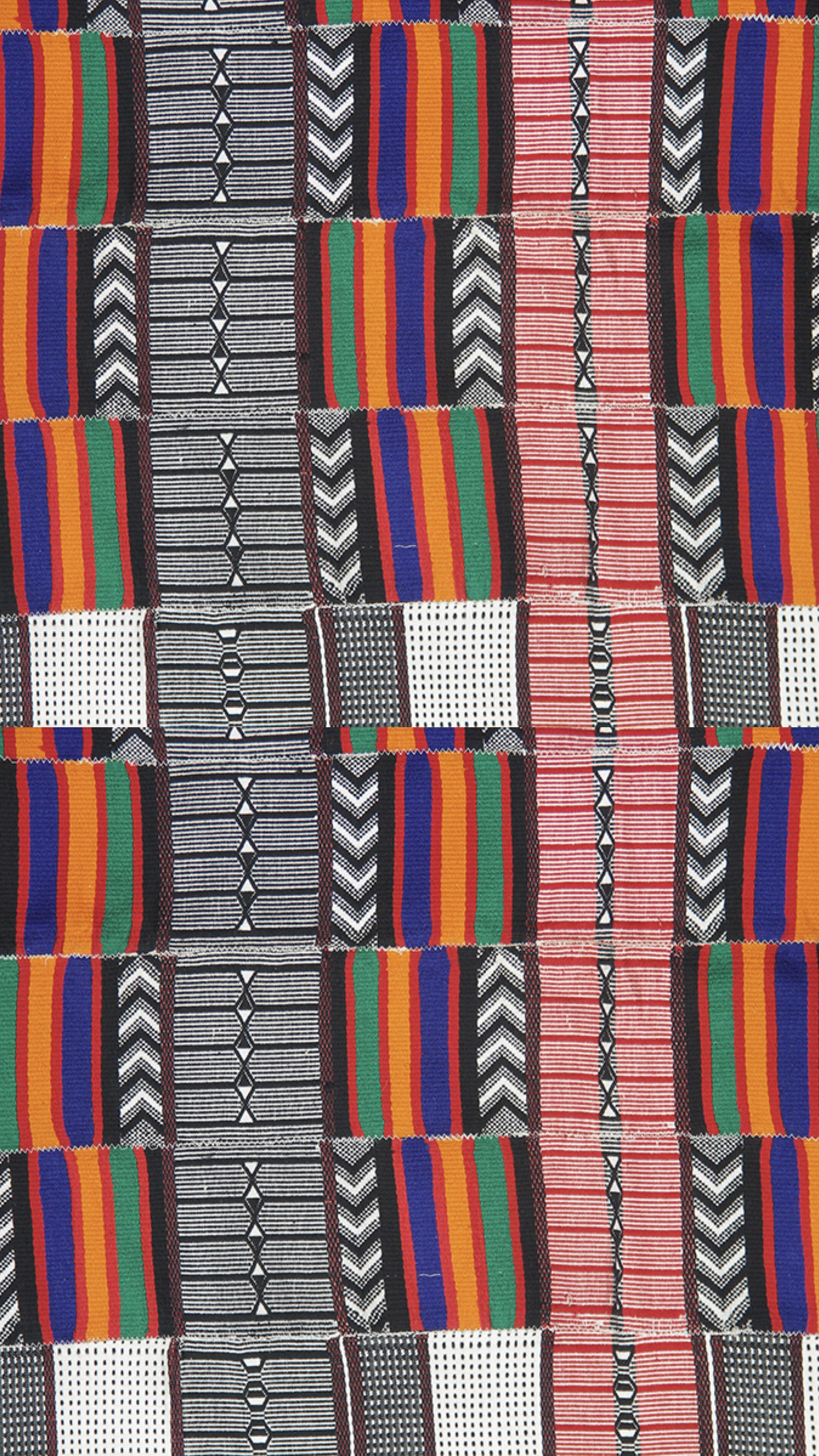

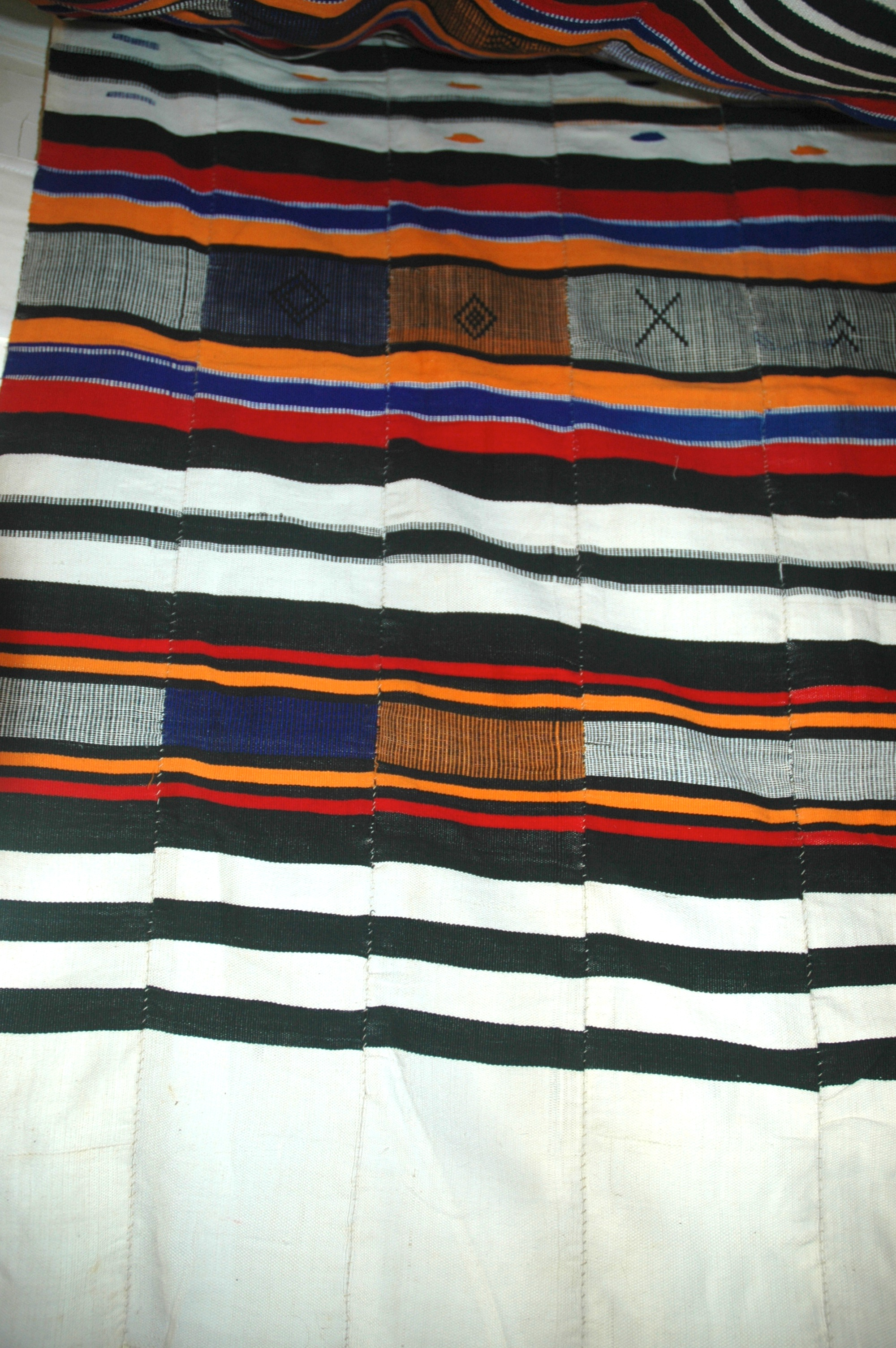

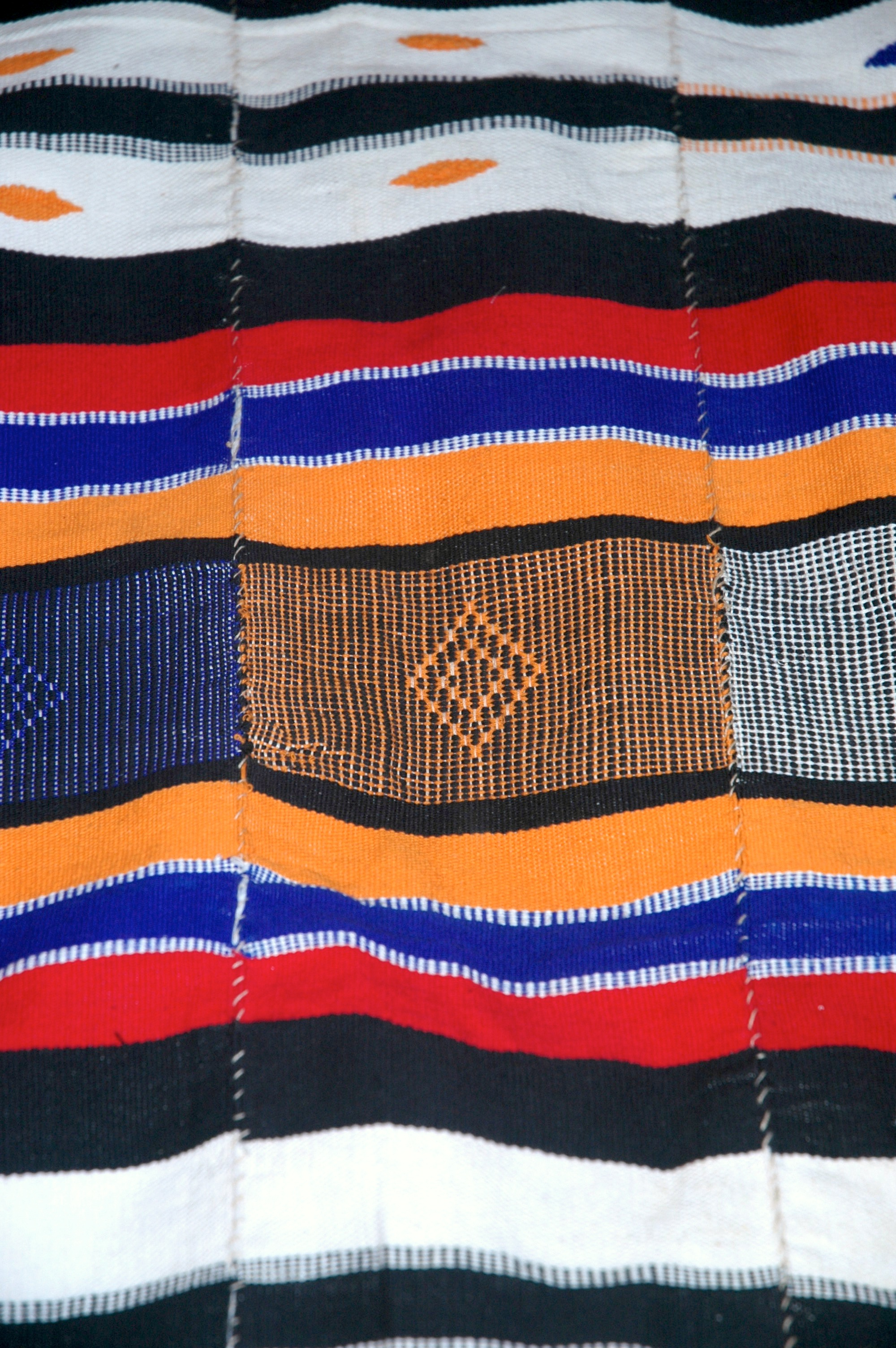

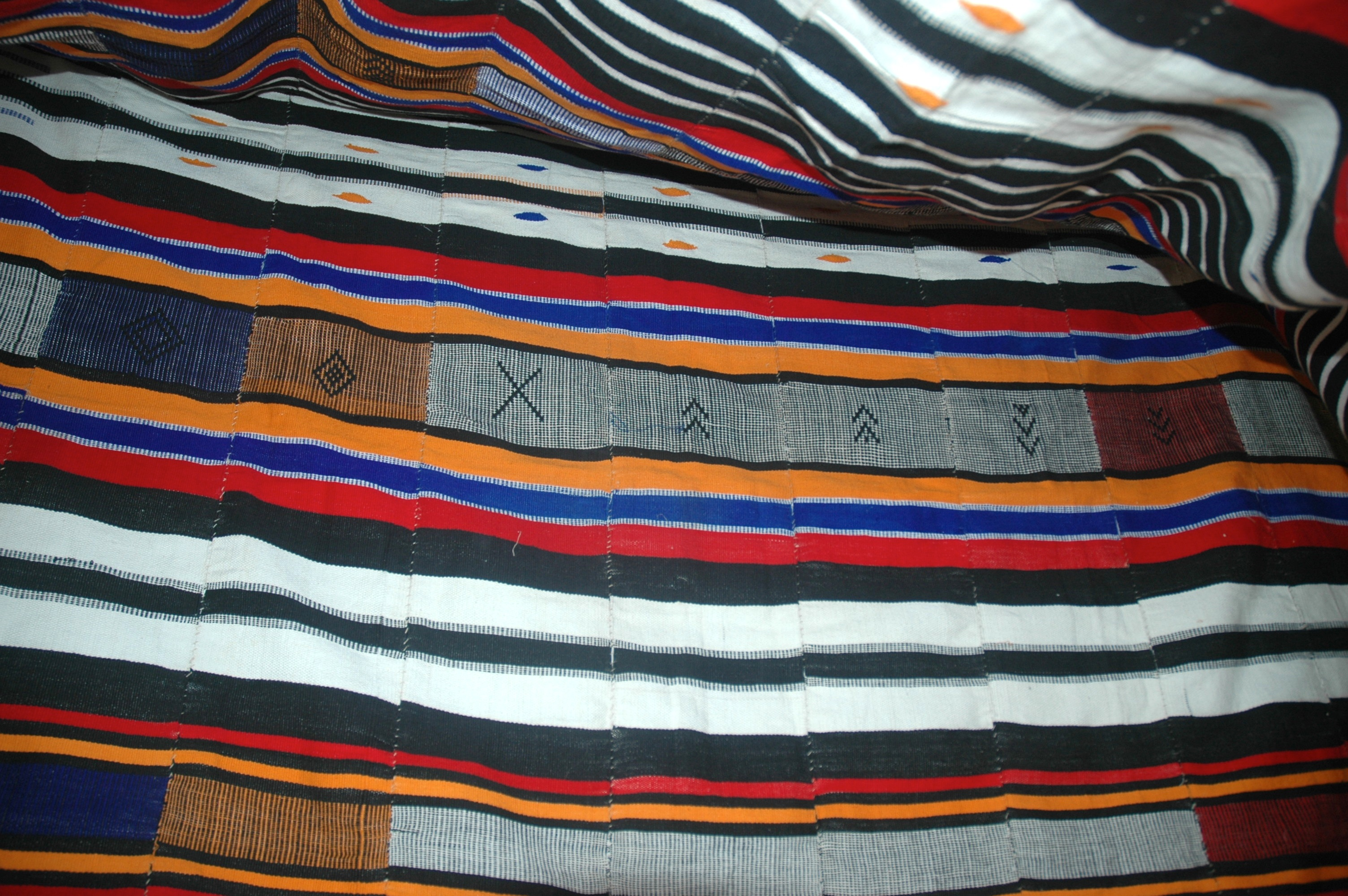

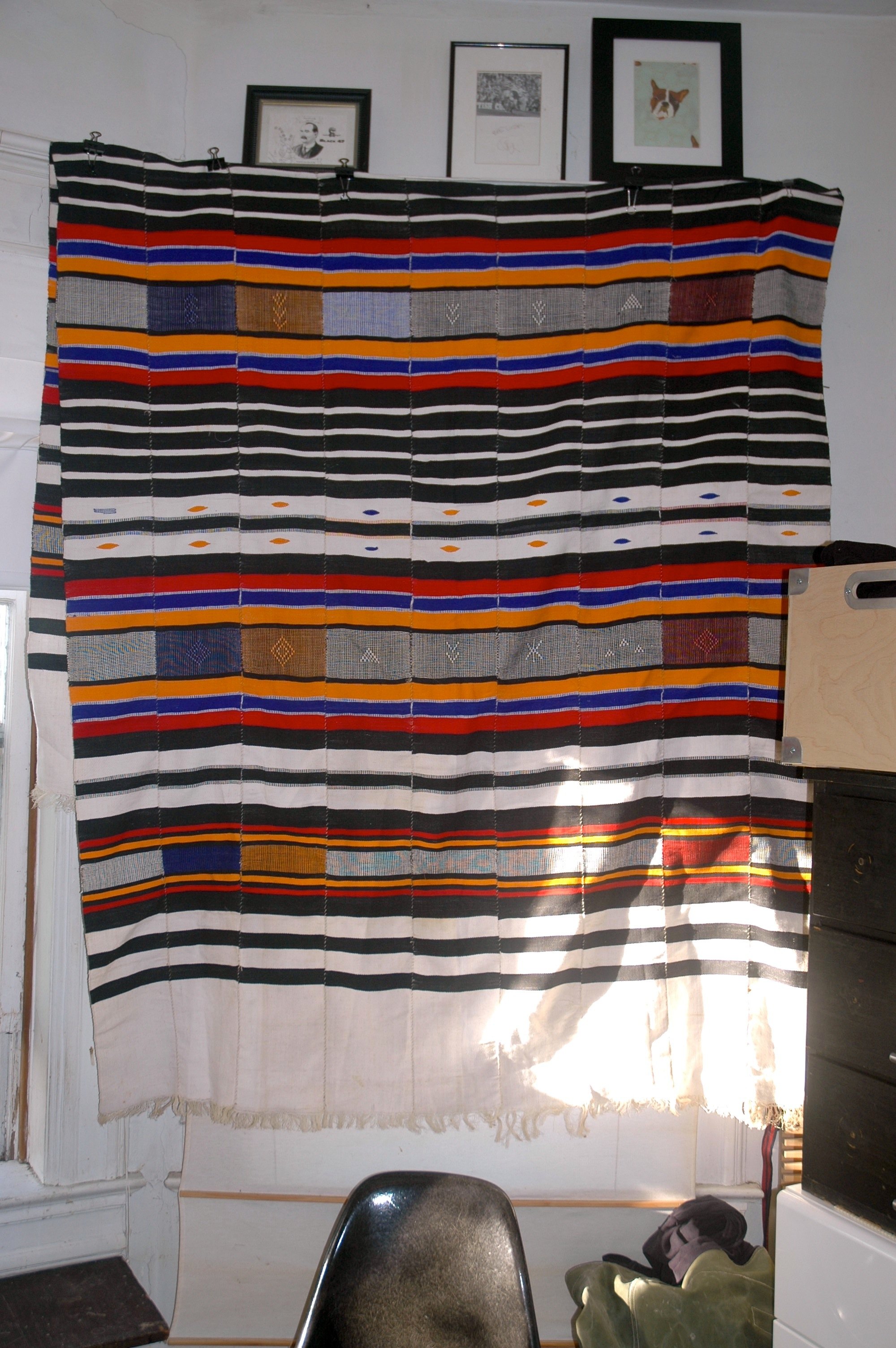

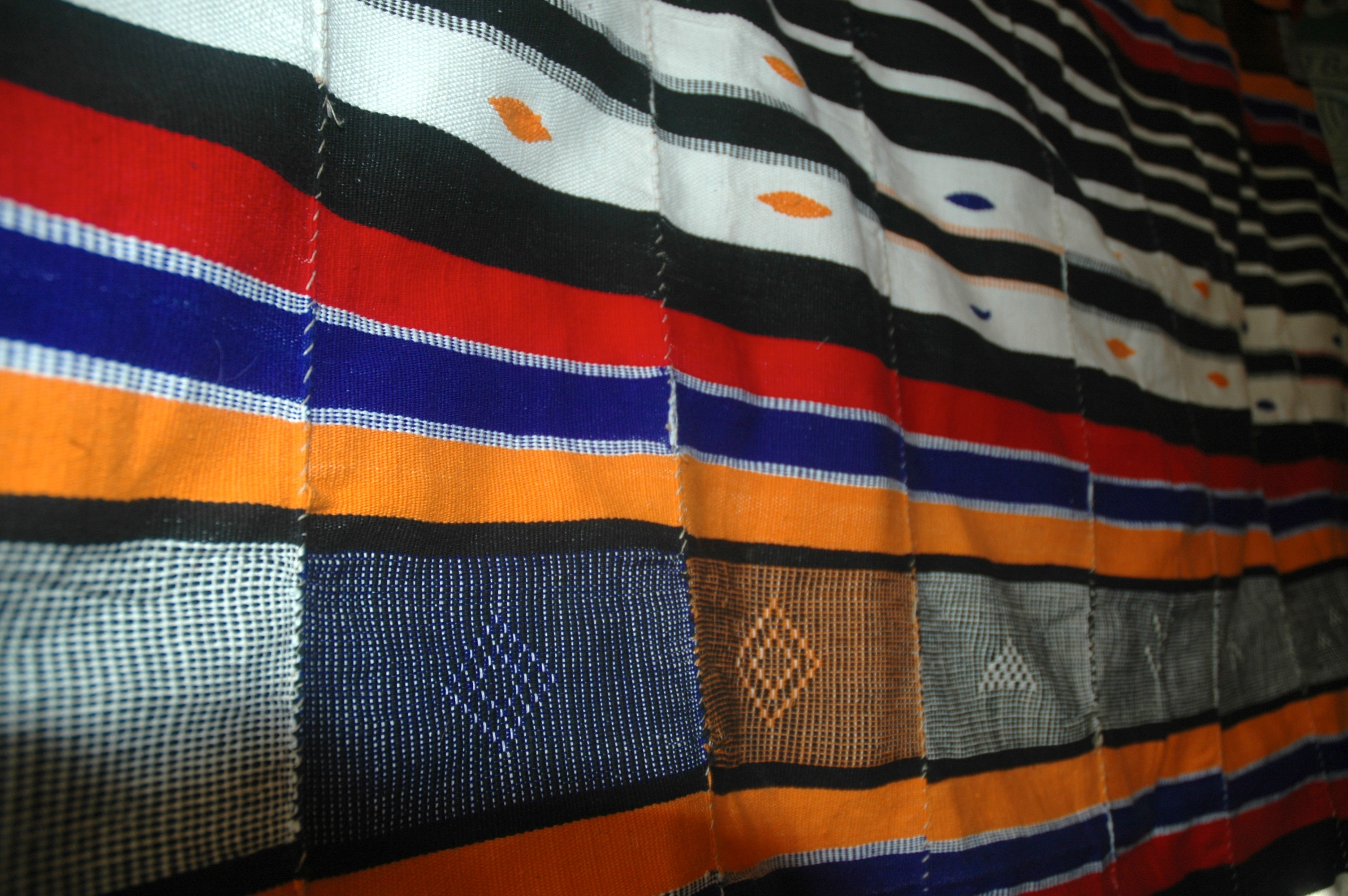

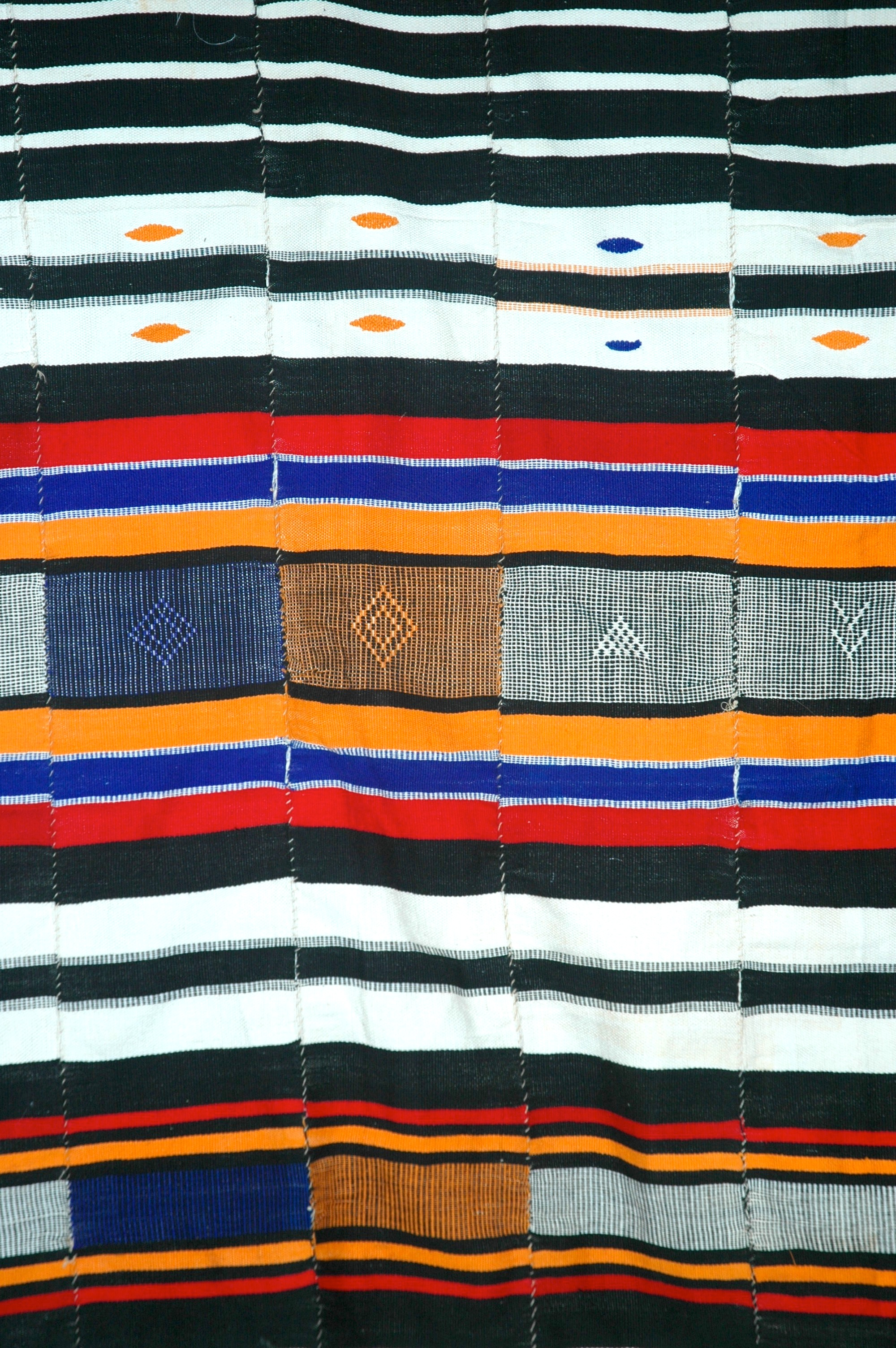

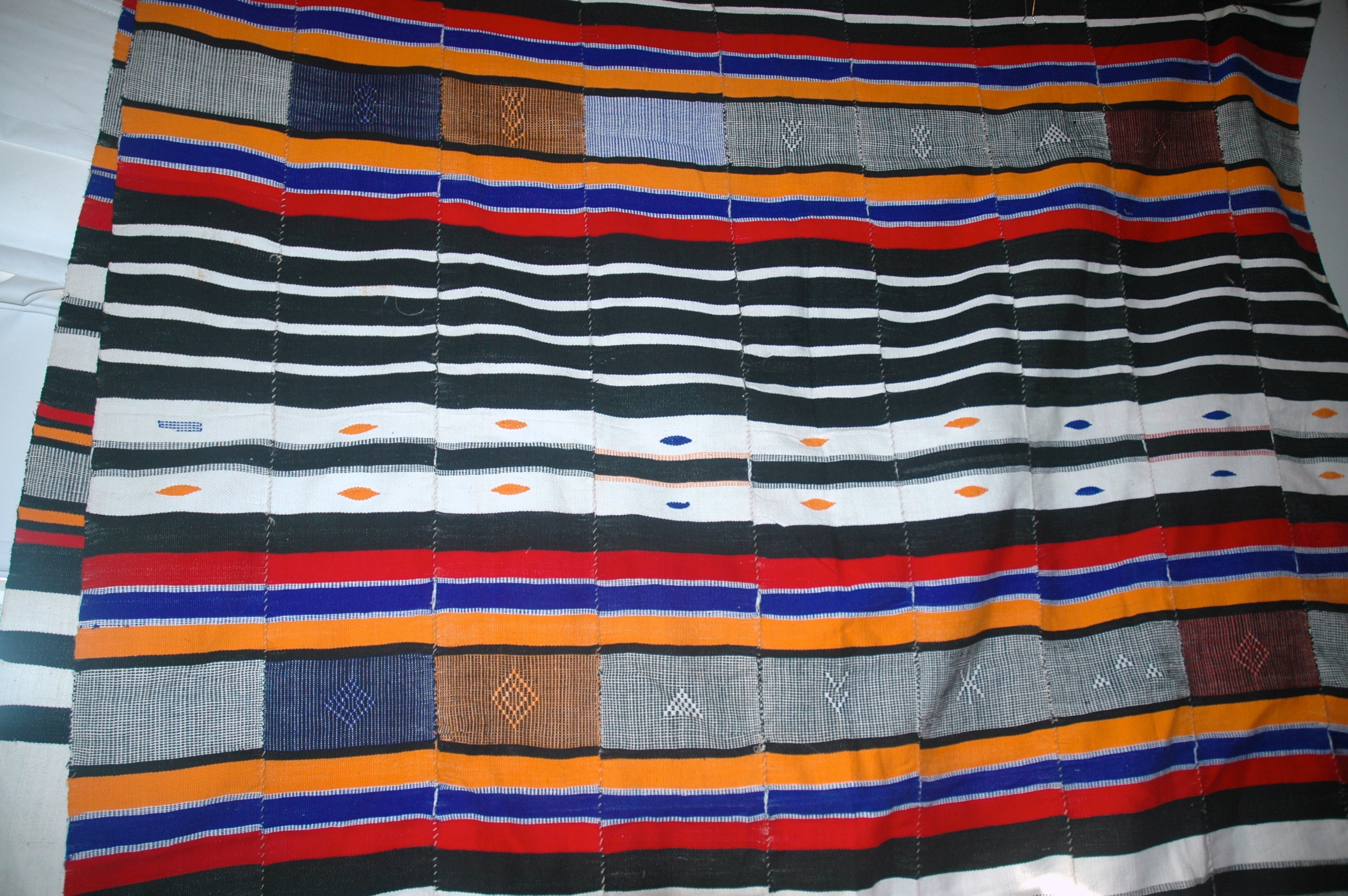

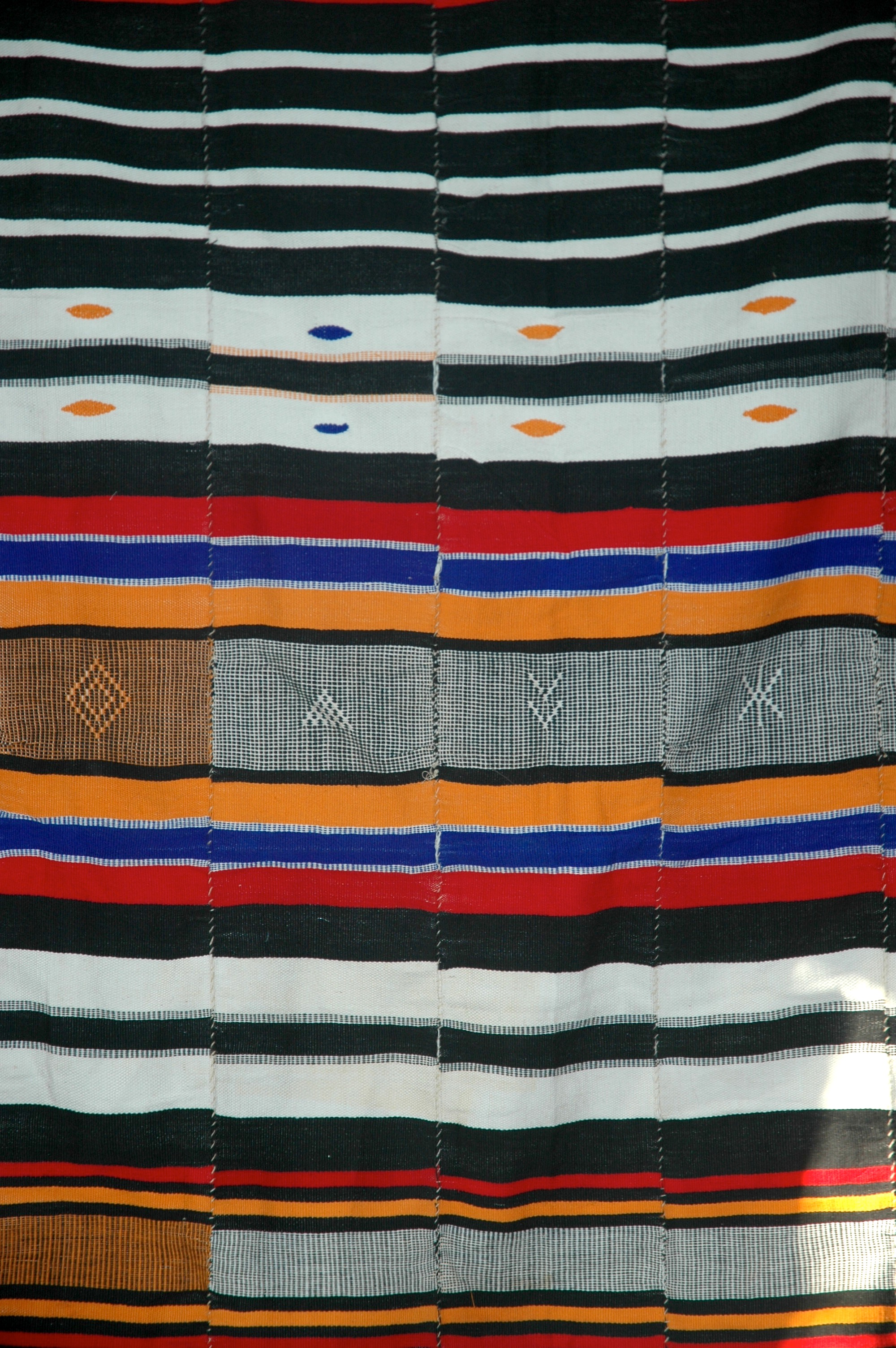

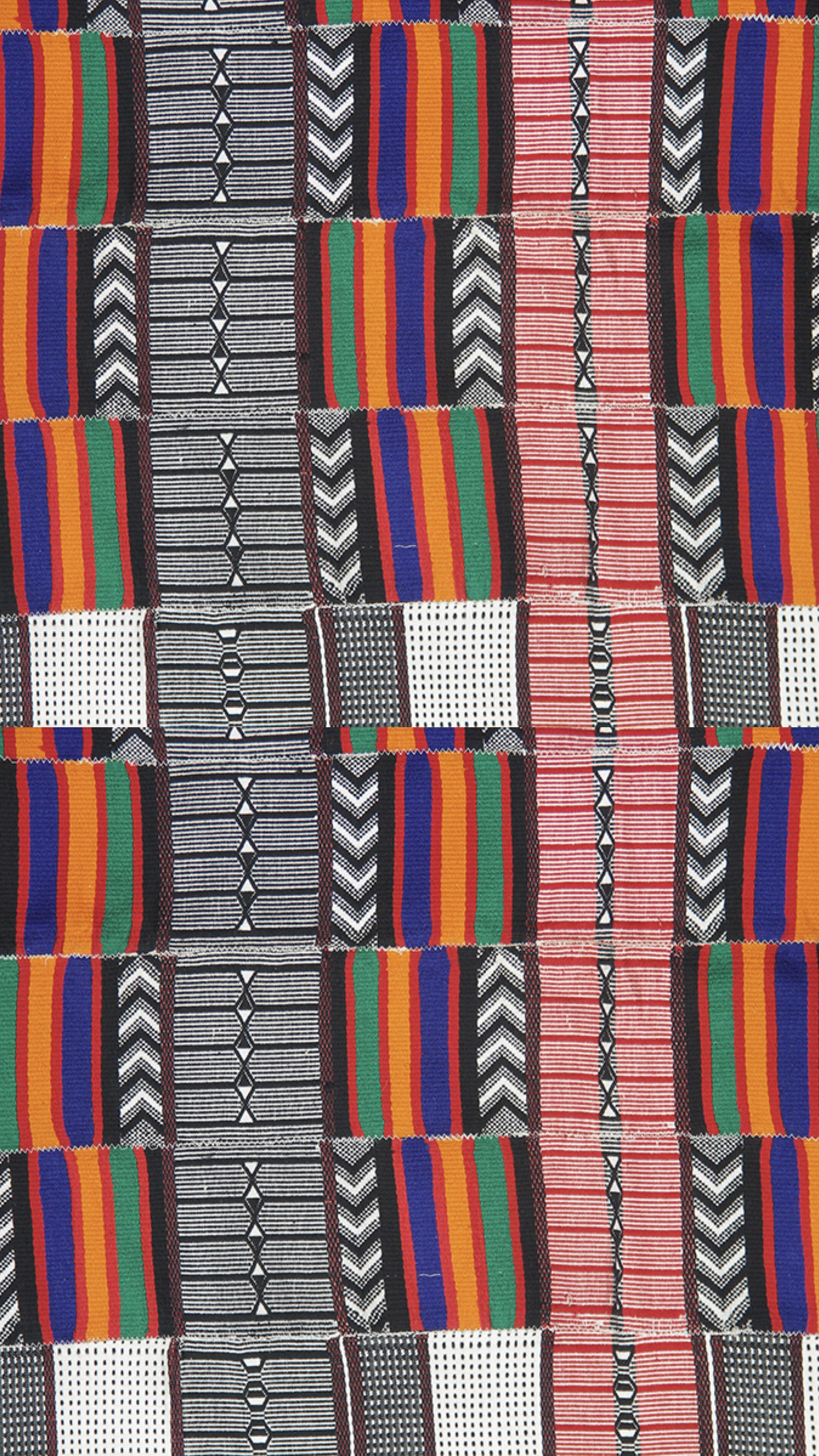
