= British Wool Marketing Board =

British product marketing board

British Wool logo used as a servicemark

The British Wool Marketing Board (also now known as British Wool) operates the central marketing system for UK fleece wool. A farmer-run organisation, British Wool was established in 1950 with the aim of achieving the best possible net return for producers. It is the only organisation in the world that collects, grades, sells and promotes fleece wool and is the only remaining agricultural commodity board in the United Kingdom.

British Wool is a non-profit-making organisation operating commercially and receiving no public financial support, returning to producers the market price for their wool, with its own costs deducted.

== Organisational structure ==
British Wool is required to register all producers with four or more sheep with the exception of producers in Shetland, which has its own arrangement by selling through a cooperative. This system was developed after the Second World War, when farmers were trying to sell their wool on an open market. The system was described as being "chaotic and discriminatory". According to British Wool, there were between 40,000 and 46,000 registered producers in 2015. The number of producers has been falling; in 1995 it was 91,000, by 2012 it was 75,000. This has also been in line with the number of sheep available; in 1990 there were 65 million sheep for wool farming, by 2012 this had fallen to 40 million.

British Wool collects, grades and auctions all types of British sheep wool on behalf of British sheep farmers.

The board of nine elected producer members, representing nine different areas of the UK, and two government appointees, meet eight times a year and report back to nine regionally elected committees.

Day-to-day operations are run from British Wool's headquarters in Bradford, West Yorkshire with smaller offices in Scotland, Wales and Northern Ireland. Wool fleeces are graded at one of the eight grading centres that they operate before being sent to auctions which are held approx. 18 times per year.

== Industry in decline, further impaired by Covid-19 ==
The growth in use of synthetic fibres, coupled with the introduction of US imports and fewer players in the wool industry’s supply chain have led to the regression, since the 1950s, of the British wool industry and its products popularity. The global wool market was forced to shut in February 2020 due to the Covid-19 pandemic, which made it impossible to sell all of the years produced crop. As a result, extensive amounts of unsold wool are stored in depots, causing prices of wool to plummet. A 14 million kg backlog is waiting to be cleared by the board, while the average price per kg has virtually halved from the previous year’s 60p to 32p. Further reasons for current decline in wool prices are Brexit uncertainty and the US-China trade war.

The situation had dramatic effects for sheep farmers across the UK. Farmers lost money through selling their product, as the costs that came with shearing and selling the wool outweighed any profits. Particularly for remote farms, where the asking price for wool was worth less than transportation and fuel costs to the given British Wool depots. Many farmers were forced to discard their wool by storing it away, composting, or through more dramatic methods such as burning. This left farmers only having to cover shearing expenses, as it is still necessary to sheer the sheep for their health and well-being (so they do not suffer from blowfly strike, which causes maggots). The wool predicament leads to the farmers growing concern about the British Wool Board policy. Some farmers feeling the organisation has been too focused on the Chinese market and missed out on establishing connections with substitute markets, alternative supply chains and creating more consumer demand.
