= Domestic sheep reproduction =

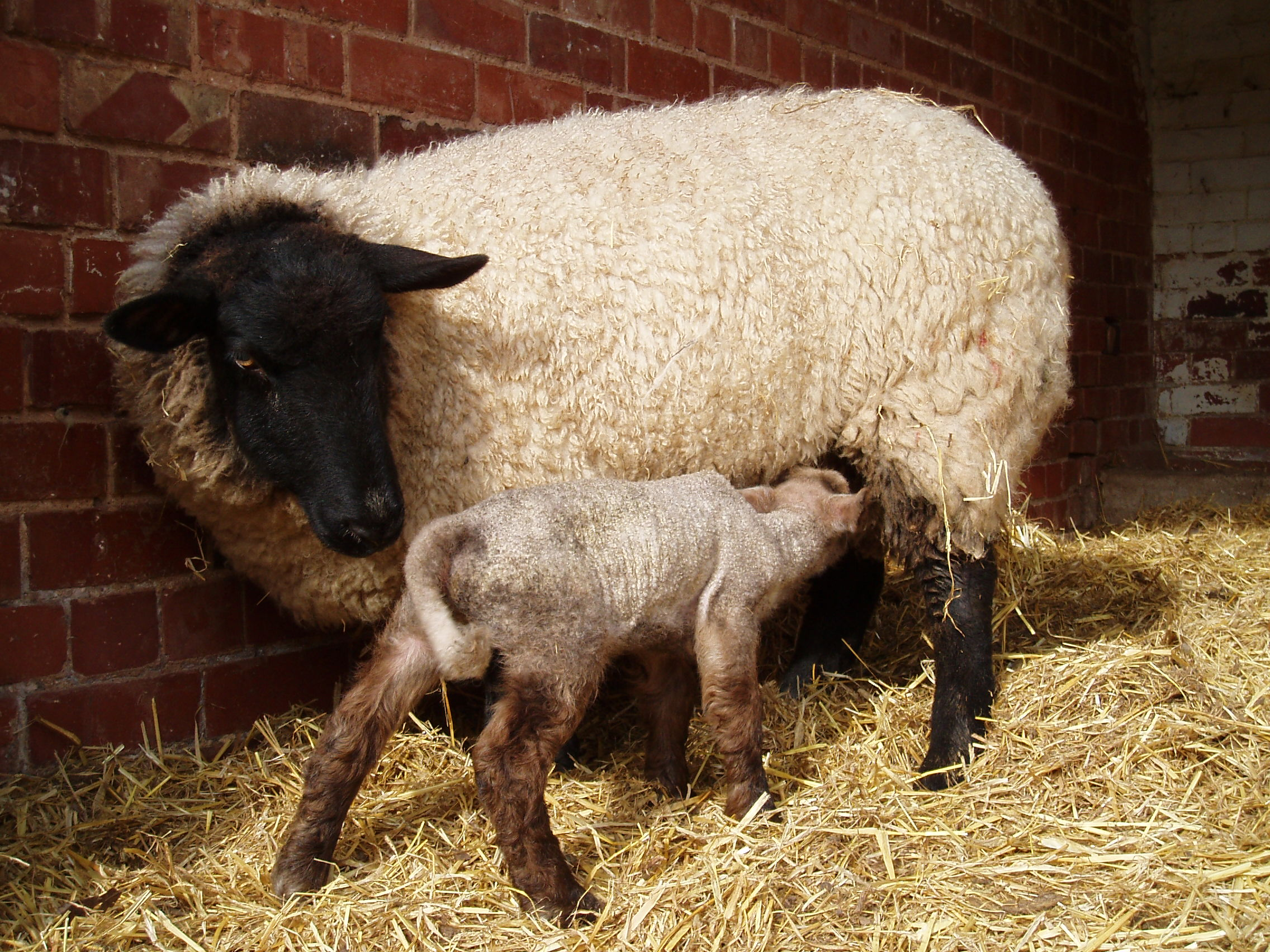
A cross-bred ewe suckles her lamb, which was the first of the 2008 spring lambing at a farm in Coventry, England

Domesticated sheep are herd animals that are bred for agricultural trade. A flock of sheep is mated by a single ram, which has either been chosen by a farmer or, in feral populations, has established dominance through physical contests with other rams. Sheep have a breeding season (tupping) in the autumn, though some can breed year-round.

As a result of the influence of humans on sheep breeding, ewes often produce multiple lambs. This increase in lamb births, both in number and birth weight, may cause problems with delivery and lamb survival, requiring the intervention of shepherds.

== Sexual behaviour ==
Ewes generally reach sexual maturity at six to eight months of age, and rams generally between four and six (though ram lambs have occasionally been known to impregnate their mothers at two months). Sheep are seasonally polyoestrus animals. Ewes enter into estrus cycles about every 17 days, which last for approximately 30 hours. They indicate sexual readiness through physical displays towards rams and emitting a scent. The Flehmen response is exhibited by rams when they smell the urine of a ewe in estrus. The vomeronasal organ has receptors which detect the estrogen in the ewe's urine. The ram displays this by extending his neck and curling his lip.

Freemartins, female bovines that are behaviorally masculine and lacking functioning ovaries, are commonly associated with cattle, but do occur to some extent in sheep. The instance of freemartins in sheep may be increasing alongside the rise in twinning (freemartins are the result of male-female twin combinations).

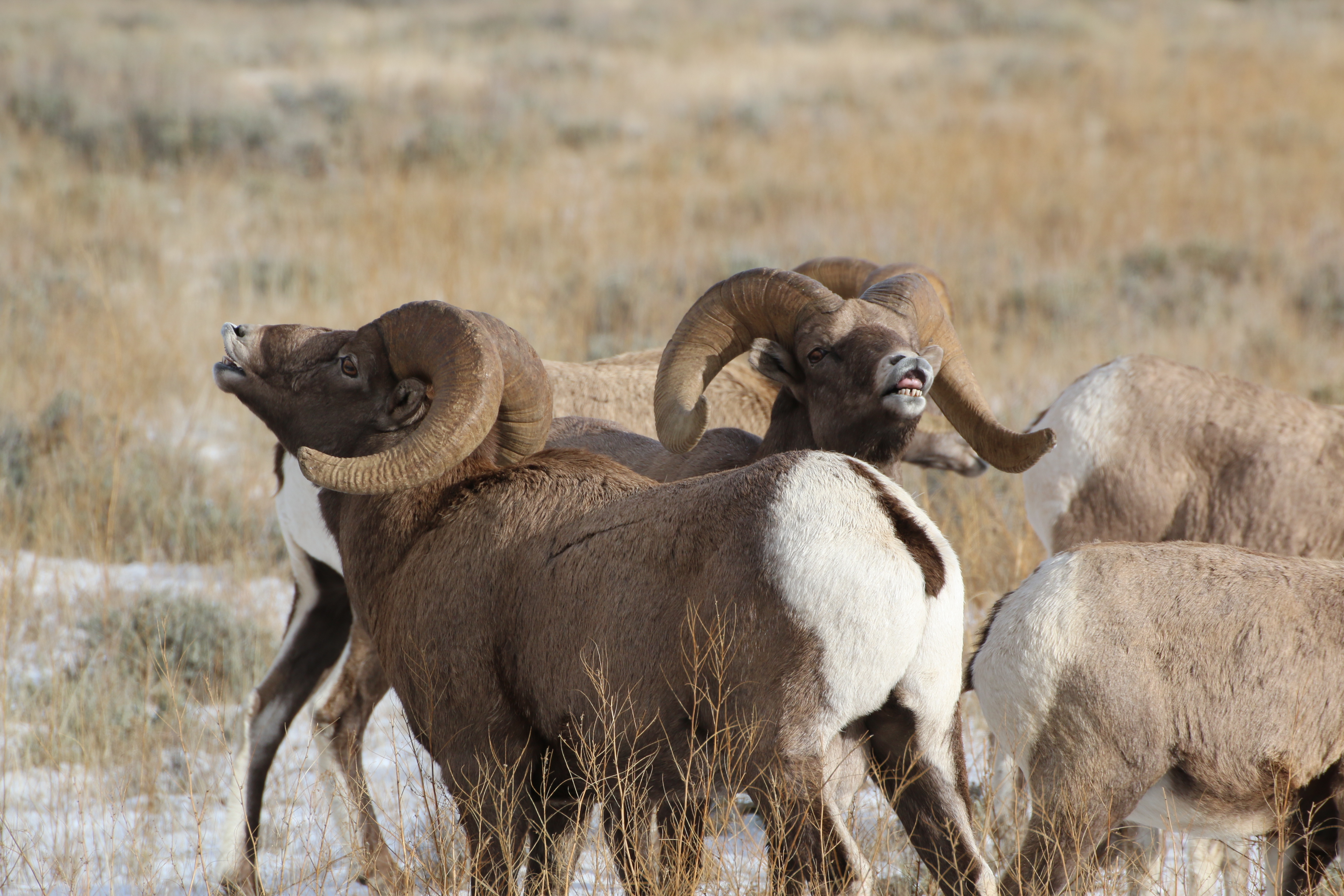
Bighorn sheep exhibiting the Flehmen response

=== Rutting ===
Without human intervention, rams may fight during the rut to determine which individuals may mate with ewes. Rams, especially unfamiliar ones, will also fight outside the breeding period to establish dominance; they can kill one another if allowed to mix freely. During the rut, even normally friendly rams may become aggressive towards humans due to increases in their hormone levels.

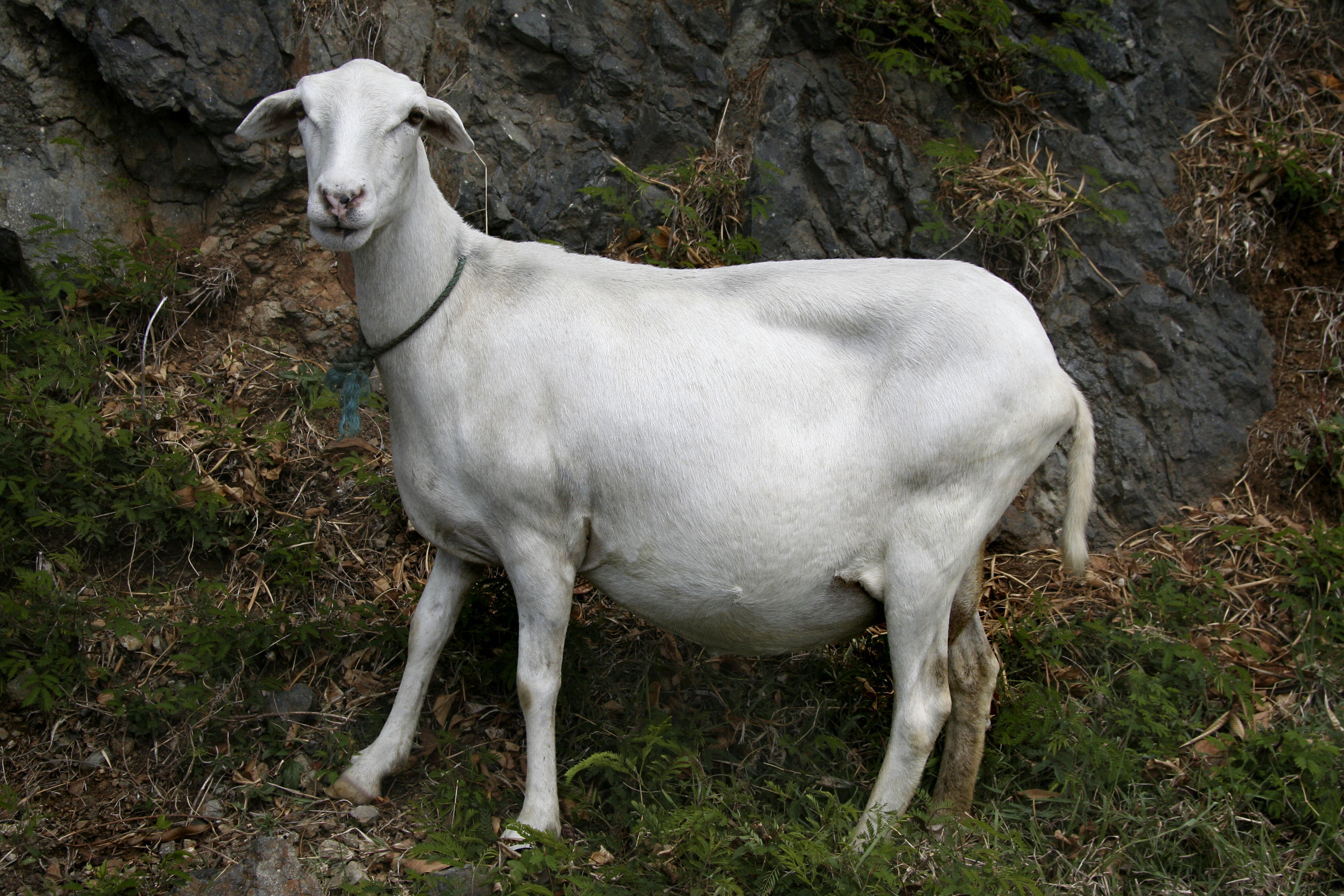
A pregnant St Croix ewe

Historically, especially aggressive rams were sometimes blindfolded or hobbled. Today, those who keep rams typically prefer softer preventative measures, such as moving within a clear line to an exit, never turning their back on a ram, and possibly dousing with water or a diluted solution of bleach or vinegar to dissuade charges.

== Pregnancy ==
Without an ultrasound or other special tools, determining if a sheep is pregnant is difficult. Ewes only begin to visibly show a pregnancy about six weeks before giving birth, so shepherds often rely on the assumption that a ram will impregnate all the ewes in a flock. However, by fitting a ram with a chest harness called a marking harness that holds a special crayon (or raddle, sometimes spelled reddle), ewes that have been mounted are marked with a colour. Dye may also be directly applied to the ram's brisket (lower chest region). This measure is not used in flocks where wool is important, since the colour of a raddle can stain the wool. The crayon in the marking harness can be changed during the breeding cycle to allow for lambing date predictions for each ewe.

After mating, sheep have a gestation period of around five months. Within a few days of the impending birth, ewes begin to behave differently. They may lie down and stand erratically, paw the ground, or otherwise act out of sync with normal flock patterns. A ewe's udder will quickly fill out, and her vulva will swell. Vaginal, uterine, or anal prolapse may also occur, in which case either stitching or a physical retainer can be used to hold the orifice in if the problem persists. Usually ewes that experience serious issues while lambing, such as prolapse, will be discarded from the flock to avoid further complications in upcoming years.

=== Artificial insemination and embryo transfer ===
In addition to natural insemination by rams, artificial insemination and embryo transfers have been used in sheep breeding programs for many years in Australia and New Zealand. These programs became more commonplace in the United States during the 2000s as the number of veterinarians qualified to perform these types of procedures with proficiency have grown. However, ovine AI is a relatively complicated procedure compared to other livestock. Unlike cattle or goats, which have straight cervices that can be vaginally inseminated, ewes have a curved cervix that is more difficult to access. Additionally, until recently, breeders were unable to control their ewe's estrus cycles. The ability to control the estrus cycle is much easier today because of products that safely assist in aligning heat cycles. Some examples of products are PG600, CIDRs, Estrumate and Folltropin V. These products contain progesterone which will bring on the induction of estrus in ewes (sheep) during seasonal anestrus. Seasonal anestrus is when ewes do not have regular estrous cycles outside the natural breeding season.

Historically, vaginal insemination of sheep only produced 40-60% success rates, and was thus called a "shot in the dark" (SID). In the 1980s, Australian researchers developed a laparoscopic insemination procedure which, combined with the use of progestogen and a pregnant mare's serum gonadotropin (PMSG), yielded much higher success rates (50-80% or more), and has become the standard for artificial insemination of sheep in the 21st century.

Semen collection is an integral component of this process. Once semen has been collected, it can be used immediately for insemination or slowly frozen for use at a later date. Fresh semen is recognized as the method of choice as it lives longer and yields higher conception rates. Frozen semen will work, but it must be the highest quality of semen and the ewes must be inseminated twice in the same day. The marketing of ram semen is a major part of this industry. Producers owning prize-winning rams have found this to be a good avenue to leverage the accolades of their most famous animals.

Embryo transfer (ET) is a minor surgical procedure with almost no risk of injury or infection when performed properly; sheep laparoscopy allows the importation of improved genetics, even of breeds that may otherwise be non-existent in certain countries due to the regulation of live animal imports. ET procedures are used to allow producers to maximize those females that produce the best lambs/kids either for retention into the flock or for sale to other producers. ET also allows producers to continue to utilize a ewe/doe that may not physically be able to carry or feed a set of lambs. With ET, a flock can be grown quickly with above average individuals of similar bloodlines. The primary industry to utilize this technology in the United States is club lamb breeders and exhibitors. It is a common practice in the commercial sheep industries of Australia, New Zealand, and South America.

Average success rates of ET in terms of embryos recovered can vary widely. Each breed will respond differently to the ET process. Typically, white-faced ewes and dogs are more fertile than black-faced ewes. A range of zero to the mid 20s in terms of viable embryos recovered from a flush procedure can be expected. Over the course of a year, the average is 6.8 transferable eggs per donor with a 75% conception rate for those eggs.

=== Infertility ===
Infertility can be attributed to many aspects of managerial practices as well as health factors. One of the main reasons for the conditions of low lambing percentages seen in a flock is due to mineral and vitamin deficiencies. The main vitamins and minerals that play a major role in fertility are selenium, copper, vitamins A and D. Other factors that affect fertility and potentially cause abortion are infectious diseases, inappropriate body conditions or toxins in feed.

== Lambing ==
As the time for lambing approaches, the lamb will drop, causing the ewe to have a sway back, exhibit restless behaviour and show a sunken appearance in front of the hipbone area. When birth is imminent, contractions begin to take place, and the fitful behaviour of the ewe may increase.

Normal labour may take one to several hours, depending on how many lambs are present, the age of the ewe, and her physical and nutritional condition prior to the birth. Though some breeds may regularly produce larger litters of lambs (records stand around nine lambs at once), most produce either single or twin lambs. The number of lambs a ewe produces per year is known as the lambing percentage. The condition of the ewe during breeding season will impact the lambing percentage as well as the size of the lambs. At some point, usually at the beginning of labour or soon after the births have occurred, ewes and lambs may be confined to small lambing jugs. These pens, which are generally two to eight feet (0.6 to 2.4 m) in length and width, are designed to aid both careful observation of ewes and to cement the bond between them and their lambs.

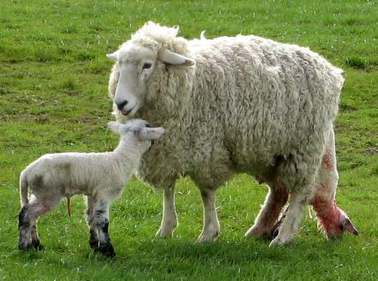
The second of twins being born on a New Zealand pasture

Ovine obstetrics can be problematic. By selectively breeding ewes that produce multiple offspring with higher birth weights for generations, sheep producers have inadvertently caused some domestic sheep to have difficulty lambing. However, it is a myth that sheep cannot lamb without human assistance; many ewes give birth directly in pasture without aid. Balancing ease of lambing with high productivity is one of the dilemmas of sheep breeding. While the majority of births are relatively normal and do not require intervention, many complications may arise.

A lamb may present in the normal fashion (with both legs and head forward), but may be too large to slide out of the birth canal. This often happens when large rams are crossed with diminutive ewes (this is related to breeding. Rams are naturally larger than ewes by comparison). Lambs may also present themselves with one shoulder to the side, completely backward, or with only some of their limbs protruding. Lambs may also be spontaneously aborted or stillborn.

Reproductive failure is a common consequence of infections such as toxoplasmosis and foot-and-mouth disease. Some types of abortion in sheep are preventable by vaccinations against these infections.

In the case of any such problems, those present at lambing (who may or may not include a veterinarian, most shepherds become accomplished at lambing to some degree) may assist the ewe in extracting or repositioning lambs. In severe cases, a caesarean section will be required to remove the lamb. After the birth, ewes ideally break the amniotic sac (if it is not broken during labour), and begin licking to clean the lamb.

The licking clears the nose and mouth, dries the lamb, and stimulates it. Lambs that are breathing and healthy at this point begin trying to stand, and ideally do so between a half and full hour, with help from the mother. Generally after lambs stand, the umbilical cord is trimmed to about an inch (2.5 centimetres). Once trimmed, a small container (such as a film canister) of iodine is held against the lamb's belly over the remainder of the cord to prevent infection.

== Postnatal care ==
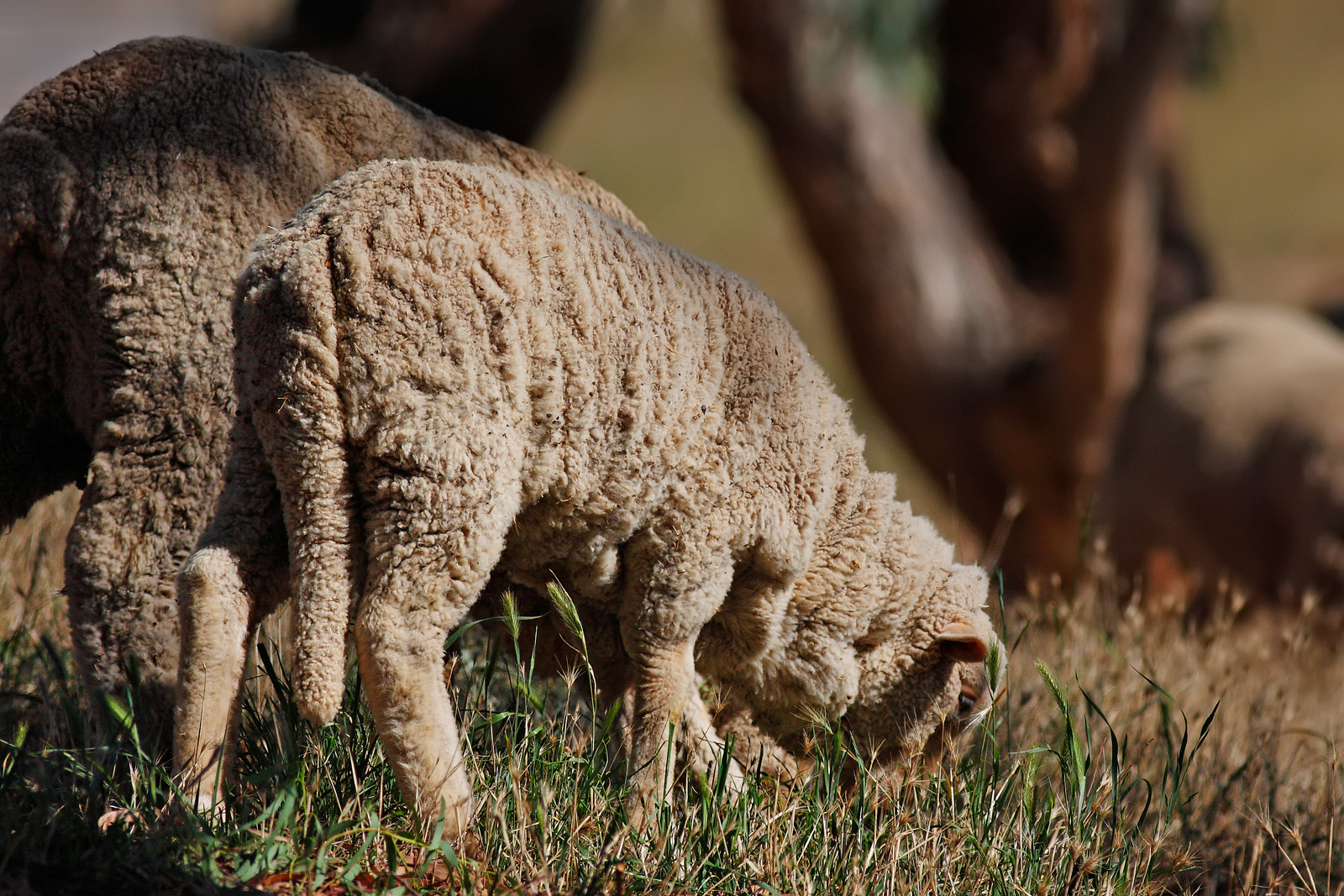
A lamb in Australia which, unusually, has not had its tail docked.

In normal situations, lambs nurse after standing, receiving vital colostrum milk. Lambs that either fail to nurse or are prevented from doing so by the ewe require aid in order to live. If coaxing the pair to accept nursing does not work, one of several steps may then be taken.

Ewes may be held or tied to force them to accept a nursing lamb. If a lamb is not eating, a stomach tube may also be used to force feed the lamb in order to save its life. In the case of a permanently rejected lamb, a shepherd may then attempt to foster an orphaned lamb onto another ewe. Lambs are also sometimes fostered after the death of their mother, either from the birth or other event.

Scent plays a large factor in ewes recognizing their lambs, so disrupting the scent of a newborn lamb with washing or over-handling may cause a ewe to reject it. Conversely, various methods of imparting the scent of a ewe's own lamb to an orphaned one may be useful in fostering. If an orphaned lamb cannot be fostered, then it usually becomes what is known as a bottle lamb—a lamb raised by people and fed via bottle.

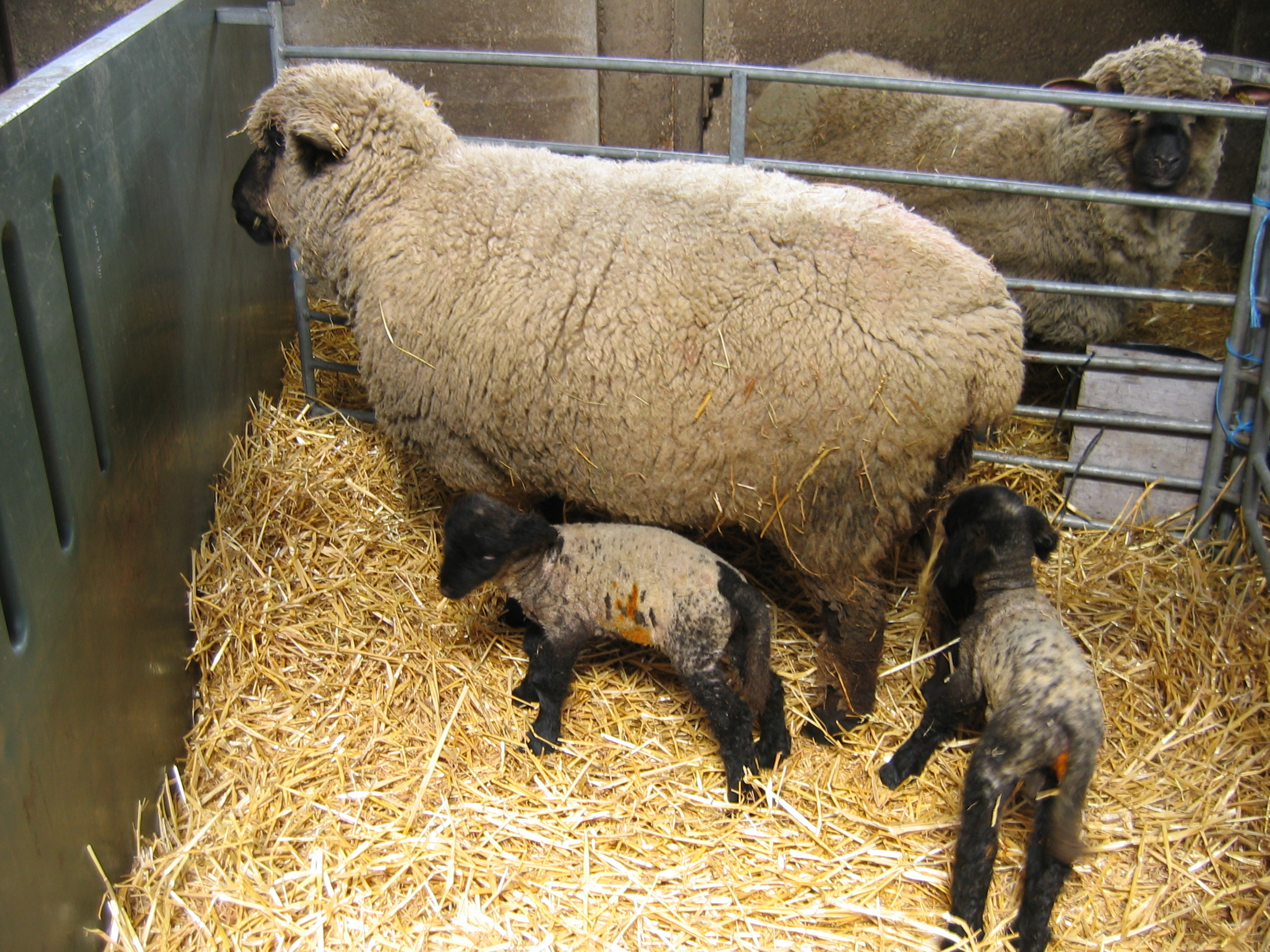
An Oxford Down ewe and her twins in a lambing jug, note the iodine stains on the lambs

After lambs are stabilized, lamb marking is carried out – this includes ear tagging, docking, castration and usually vaccination. Ear tags with numbers are the primary mode of identification when sheep are not named; it is also the legal manner of animal identification in the European Union: the number may identify the individual sheep or only its flock. When performed at an early age, ear tagging seems to cause little or no discomfort to lambs. However, using tags improperly or using tags not designed for sheep may cause discomfort, largely due to excess weight of tags for other animals.

Ram lambs not intended for breeding are castrated, though some shepherds choose to avoid the procedure for ethical, economic or practical reasons. Ram lambs that will be slaughtered or separated from ewes before sexual maturity are not usually castrated. In most breeds, lambs' tails are docked for health reasons. The tail may be removed just below the lamb's caudal tail flaps (docking shorter than this may cause health problems such as rectal prolapse), but in some breeds the tail is left longer, or is not docked at all.

Docking is not necessary in short-tailed breeds, and it is not usually done in breeds in which a long tail is valued, such as Zwartbles. Though docking is often considered cruel and unnatural by animal rights activists, it is considered to be a critical step in maintaining the health of the sheep by sheep producers. Long, woolly tails make shearing more difficult, interfere with mating, and make sheep extremely susceptible to parasites, especially those that cause flystrike.

Both castration and docking can be performed with several instruments. An elastrator places a tight band of rubber around an area, causing it to atrophy and fall off in a number of weeks. This process is bloodless and does not seem to cause extended suffering to lambs, who tend to ignore it after several hours. In addition to the elastrator, a Burdizzo, emasculator, heated chisel or knife are sometimes used. After one to three days in the lambing jugs, ewes and lambs are usually sufficiently stabilized to allow reintroduction to the rest of the flock.

== Commercial sheep breeding ==
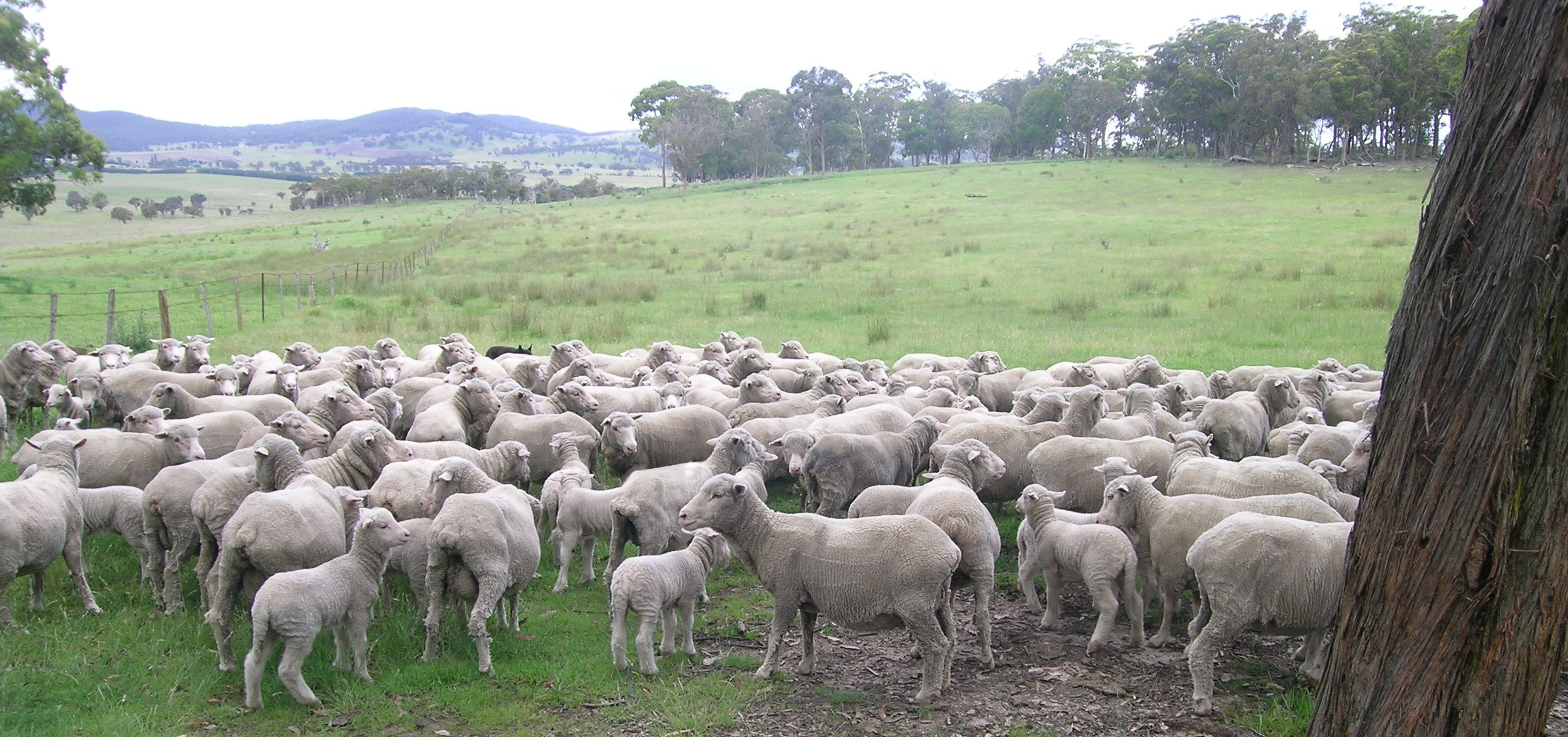
Merino ewes and lambs in Walcha, New South Wales

In the large sheep producing nations of South America, Australia and New Zealand sheep are usually bred on large tracts of land with much less intervention from the grazers or breeders. Merinos are one of the primary breeds used in these regions, and much of the land in these countries does not lend itself to the mob intervention that is found in smaller flock breeding countries. In these countries there is little need, and no option but for ewes to lamb outdoors as there are insufficient structures to handle the large flocks of ewes there. New Zealand ewes produce 36 million lambs each spring time, which is an average of 2,250 lambs per farm. Australian grazers, too, do not receive the financial support that governments in other countries provide to sheep breeders. Low-cost sheep breeding is based on large numbers of sheep per labour unit and having ewes that are capable of unsupervised lambing to produce hardy, active lambs.

== Managerial aspects ==
For breeders intent on strict improvements to their flocks, ewes are classed and inferior sheep are removed prior to mating in order to maintain or improve the quality of the flock. Muffled (woolly) faces have long been associated with lower fertility rates. Stud or specially selected rams are chosen with aid of objective measurements, genetic information and evaluation services that are now available in Australia and New Zealand. The choice of mating time is governed by many factors including climate, market requirements and feed availability. Rams are typically mated at about 2.5 years old, depending on the age of the sheep, plus consideration as to the size and type of mating paddocks. The mating period ranges from about 6 to 8 weeks in commercial flocks. Longer mating times result in management problems with lamb marking and shearing etc.

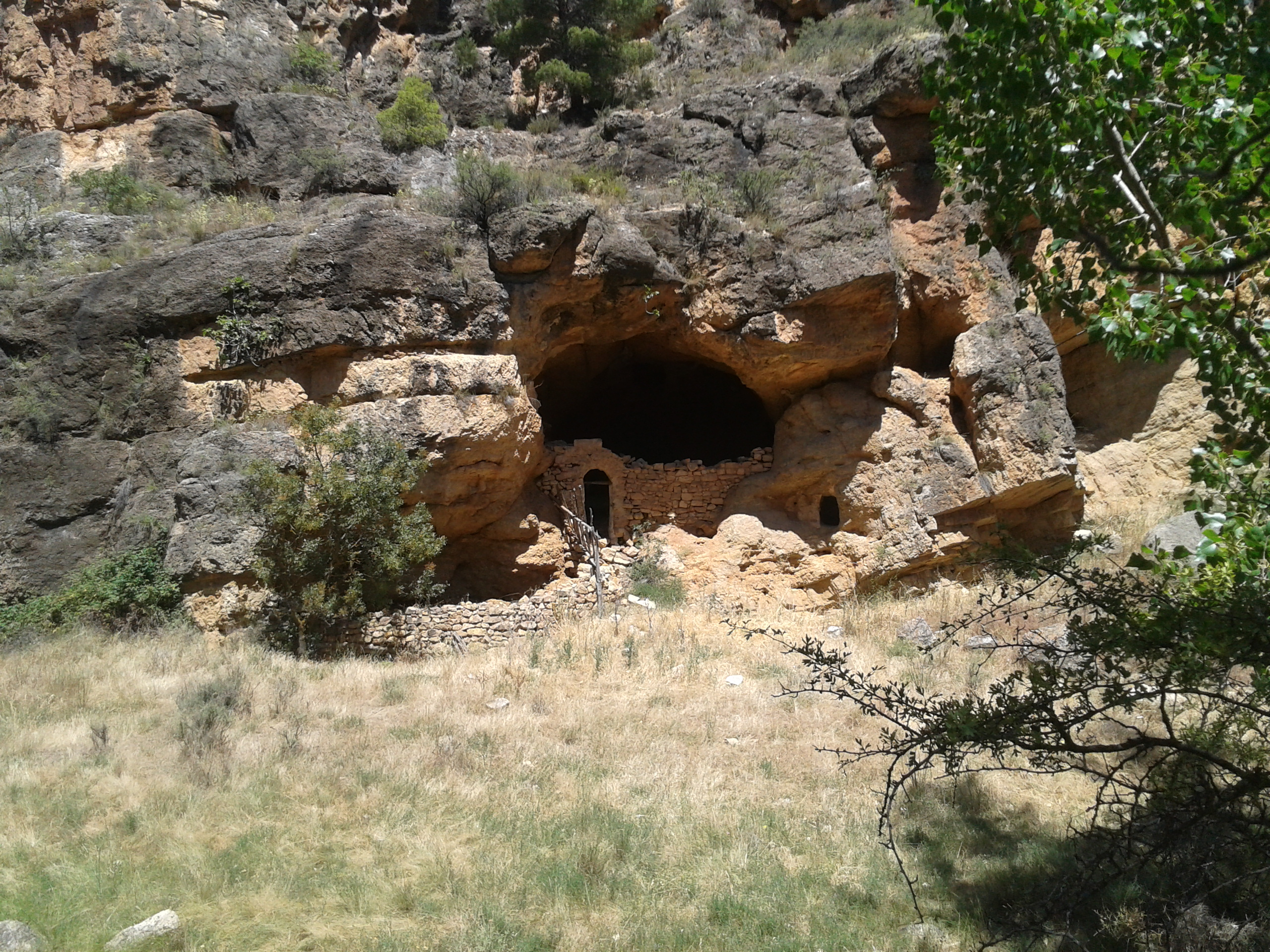
A Middle age Paridera in a Natural Cave near to Monasterio de Piedra.

Good nutrition is vital to ewes during the last 6 weeks of pregnancy in order to prevent pregnancy toxemia, especially in twin bearing ewes. Overfeeding, however, may result in overly large single lambs and dystocia. Shearing ewes before lambing reduces the number of ewes that are cast (i.e., unable to rise unassisted), and the number of lambs and ewes that are lost. Lambs, too, are aided in finding the udder and suckling a shorn ewe. In addition, shearing the ewe before lambing can increase the quality of the fleece as wool breaking can occur since giving birth is such a major stress on the ewe's body. It is important to keep in mind weather conditions prior to shearing ewes, especially in colder climates.

After shearing ewes are typically placed in well sheltered paddocks that have good feed and water. Attention to ewes that are lambing varies according to the breed, size and locations of properties. Unless they are stud ewes it is unlikely that they will receive intensive care. On stations with large paddocks there is a policy of non-interference. On other properties the mobs are inspected by stockmen at varying intervals to stand cast ewes and deal with dystocia. Producers also sometimes drift pregnant ewes away from ewes that have already lambed, in order to prevent smothering.

Lambs are usually marked at three to six weeks of age, but a protracted lambing season may necessitate two markings.

=== Inbreeding depression ===
Inbreeding tends to occur in flocks of limited size and where only a single or a few rams are used. Associated with inbreeding is a decline in progeny performance usually referred to as inbreeding depression. Inbreeding depression has been found for lamb birthweight, average daily weight gain from birth until two months, and litter size. Inbreeding depression can cause diseases and deformities to arise in a flock.

== Other countries ==
In the major sheep countries of Argentina, Uruguay, Brazil, Peru and Chile, breeders are also utilizing fleece testing and performance recording schemes as a means of improving their flocks.

== New research ==
In 2008, for the first time in history, researchers at Cheswick CSIRO research station, between Uralla and Armidale, New South Wales used stem cells to develop surrogate rams and bulls. These males then produce the viable semen of another male.

The approach in these sheep experiments involves irradiating a ram's testes while placing stem cells from a second ram into the testes of the first, ram A. In the following weeks ram A produces semen the usual way, but is using the stem cells of ram B and therefore producing semen carrying the genetics of ram B rather than those of his own. Ram A therefore has effectively become a surrogate ram.

The viable semen is then implanted in the ewe and the many lambs born through this process are proving to be normal and healthy. DNA tests have proved that up to 10% of the lambs are sired by the surrogate ram and the rest carry the genetics of the donor ram.

Another area of research that is growing in importance is the reduction of greenhouse gas emissions, mainly methane, from livestock. Ruminants are responsible for contributing the highest emissions out of all types of animals. Many researchers are conducting studies to determine how manipulating sheep diets may help reduce these dangerous emissions.
