= Wether =

Castrated ram

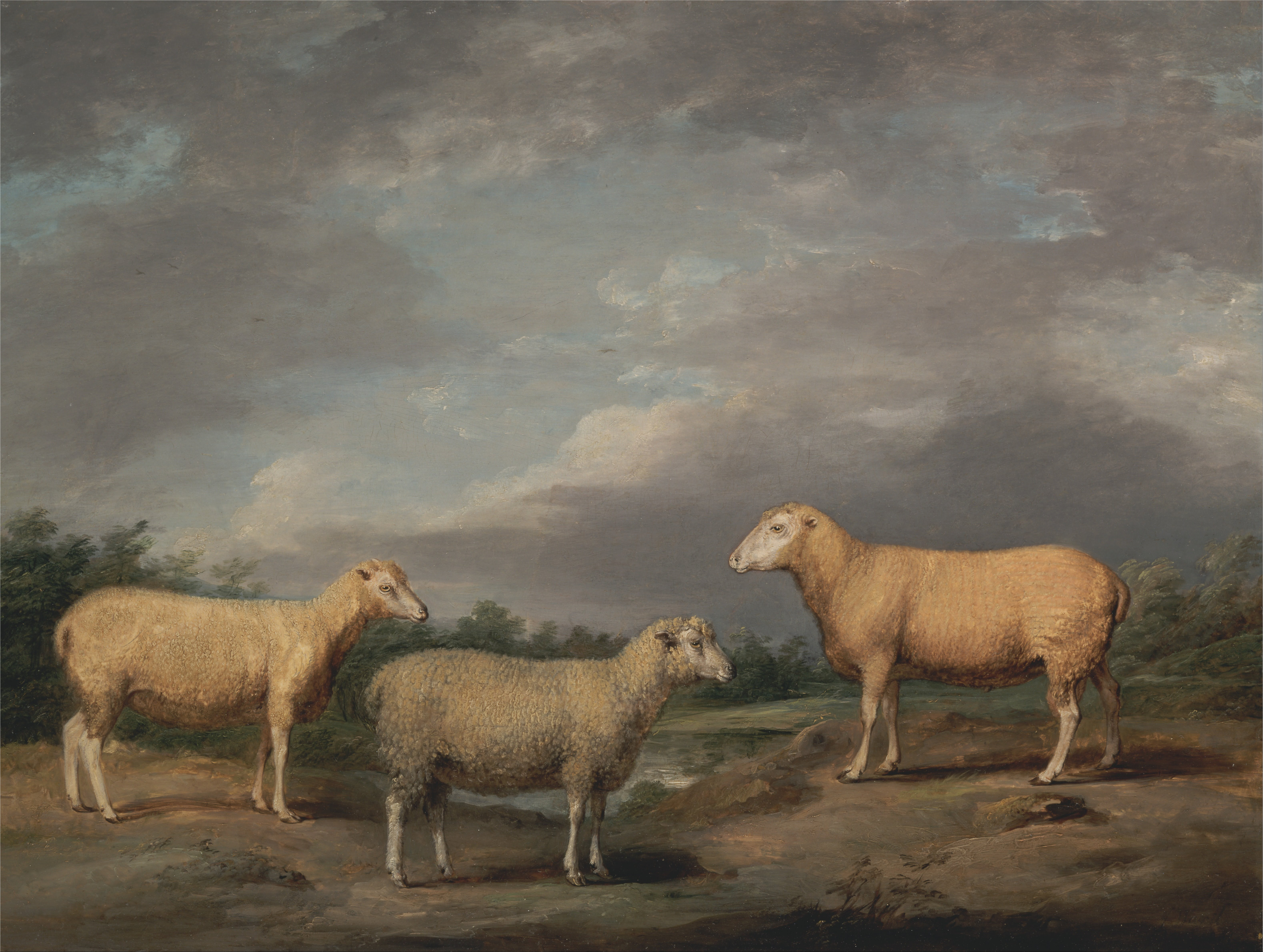
A painting by James Ward, Ryelands Sheep: the King's Ram, the King's Ewe and Lord Somerville's Wether

A wether is a castrated male sheep or goat. Wethers have reduced levels of testosterone compared to intact rams (male sheep) and bucks (male goats), and thus are less aggressive and are generally easier to manage for farmers and ranchers. Only a small percentage of males are needed for breeding duty; many of the rest are thus castrated for ease of control. Wethers have been used as pets, guides, pack animals, and flock leaders. When these are not needed, they are raised for their meat.

== Etymology and related terms ==
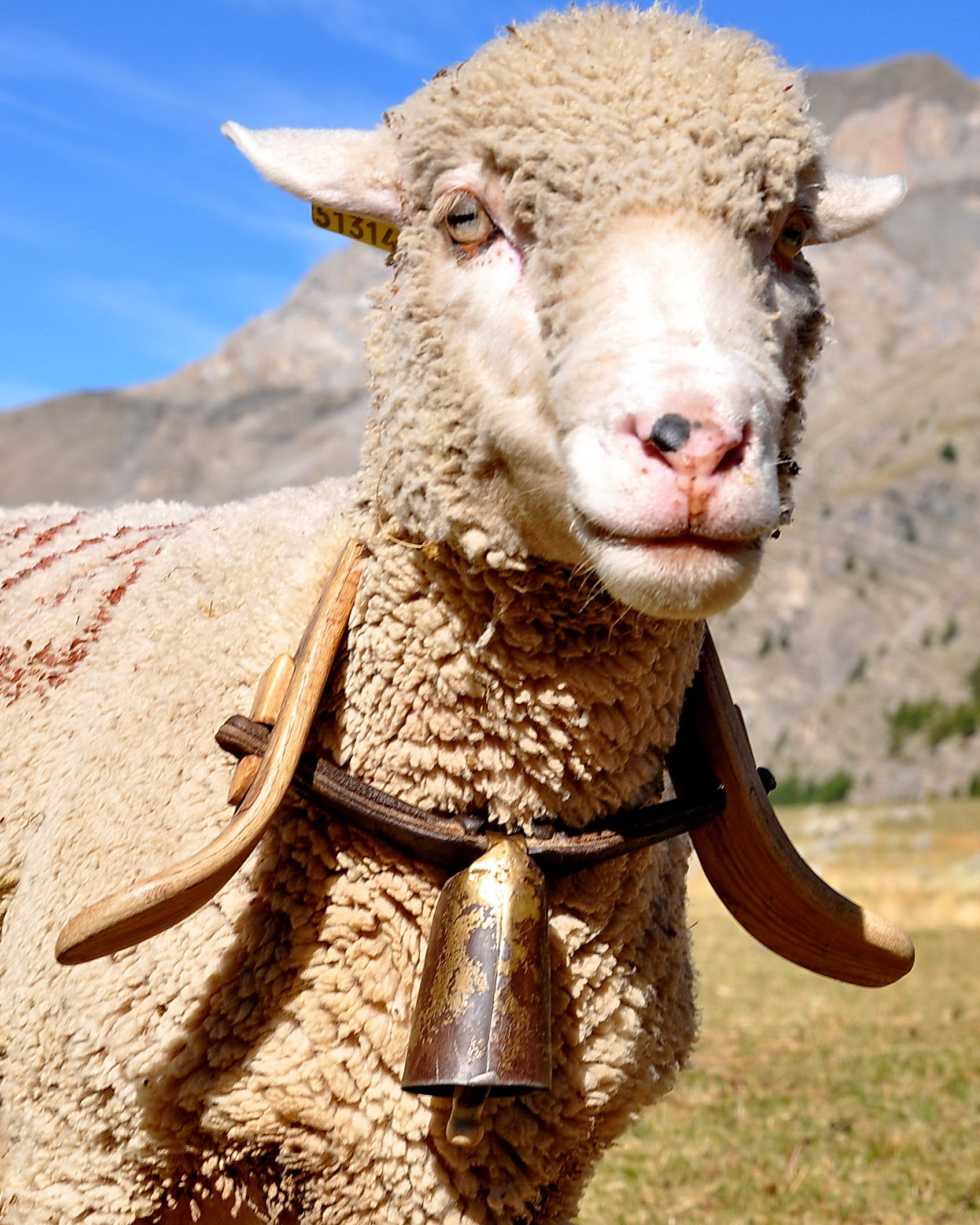
A bellwether sheep, with a bell around its neck

The word wether originates before the 12th century, and was probably spelled weþer or wæþer in Old English with a thorn character (þ, pronounced th). In Middle English, wether could refer to any male sheep (both castrated and uncastrated), but its meaning later narrowed to just castrated sheep and goats.

The related term bellwether originated somewhat later, in the 15th century. Middle English's belle-wether referred to the practice of placing a bell around the neck of the lead wether. A shepherd could then note the movements of the animals by hearing the bell, even when the flock was not in sight. This could substitute for the presence of a guard dog watching a flock.

The equivalent for castrated male cattle is a steer, although large ruminants like cattle are generally raised and treated differently from small ruminants like sheep and goats. A ram or buck castrated either incompletely or later in their lives than usual is sometimes called a stag, not to be confused with a male deer.

== Purpose ==
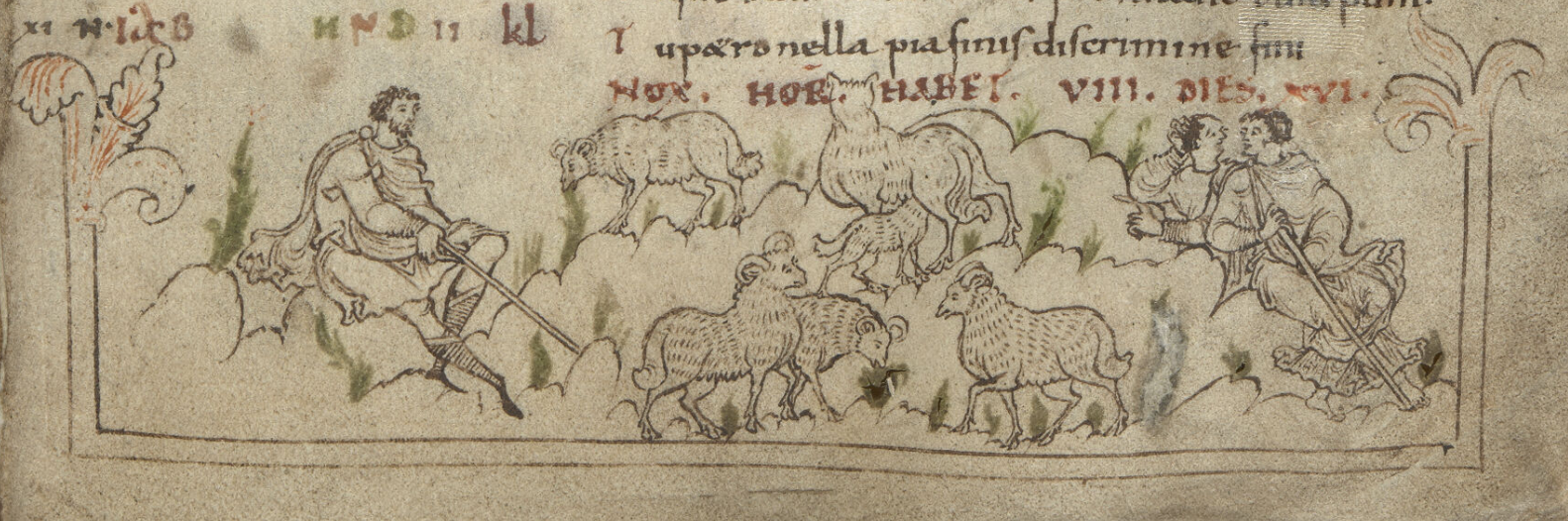
An image of shepherds and sheep from the Julius Work Calendar, a calendar created around 1020 in Anglo-Saxon England. M. L. Ryder hypothesizes that the sheep here are mostly wethers kept for their wool, excluding the polled ewe which is suckling a lamb.

In general, there is not a great demand for male sheep and goats, as a single male can breed with many female ewes and does. One guide writes that "not one in a hundred [males] can be kept, profitably, as a herd sire."

The most prominent use of raising males is for lamb and mutton meat, and goat meat. Rams have more muscle and less fat than ewes and wethers, and are sometimes believed to have a more "intense" flavor, making ram meat worth slightly less than wether meat. (Note: More recently, some have said the preference against ram meat is unjustified. One study around 1915 suggested wethers had around 10 pounds (4.5 kg) more market weight per head than rams. However, later studies on conditions in the 1980s and 2020s suggested rams have greater body weight in modern conditions at the same age. Wether carcasses also have more fat and less lean than ram carcasses, which may be less appealing to 21st century tastes, although they remain easier to manage and trade.) If a lamb or goat is intended to be slaughtered very young (e.g. around 5-6 months age), there is no need for castration. However, those raised longer (e.g. to an age of 6-12 months) will generally be castrated. Slaughterhouses prefer handling castrated males and will usually pay more for them. And for goats, this avoids a "buck odor" to the goat meat.

When raising sheep for wool, wethers are commonly used. This is because males produce more wool than females, but rams can fight each other and reduce their lifespan if left intact but not carefully managed. Sometimes entire wool flocks are wethers. A full wether flock makes the most sense in eras and locations with high wool prices, such as medieval England or the Carolingian Empire, and is reported as far back as the Bronze Age Minoan civilization. Even when wool prices are depressed, this is still sometimes done in areas with dry climates such as modern Australia. Goats raised for their fiber, such as cashmere goats and Angora goats, are also often castrated, although these may be castrated later in their life than meat goat wethers (e.g. at around 6 months of age rather than 3–4 weeks).

Especially in pre-modern eras, sheep wethers could be used to guide flocks, as "bellwethers" above (regardless of if an actual bell was used). Aristotle's book History of Animals reports that in the 4th century BCE, a wether would be trained in every flock to lead it and answer to its name. Wethers also tended to live longer, spared from the lambing and milking duties of ewes, or the in-fighting of rams; Aristotle reports wethers living fifteen years if well-kept, compared to just ten for ewes. Goat wethers can also be used to lead sheep flocks.

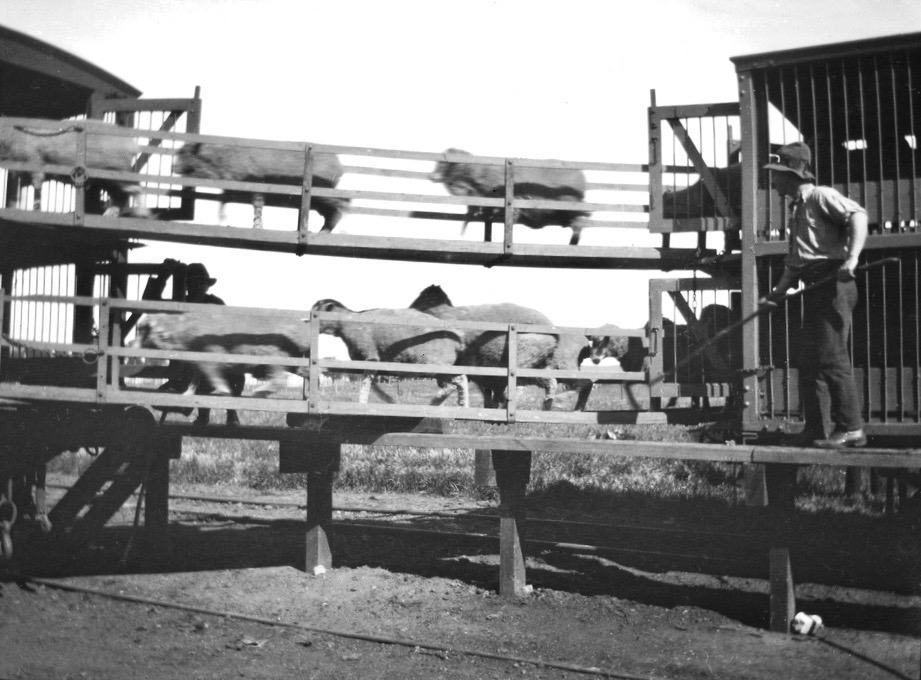
Transferring sheep from narrow gauge stock cars (right) to broad gauge cars at Terowie, South Australia in 1921. Railwaymen kept a wether as a pet to have it lead other sheep between the stock cars.

A use for wethers is as pack goats, beasts of burden used to transport in tough terrain. Goats remain a viable option for moving cargo, especially in hilly and untamed regions. Wethers are the most standard choice for this role, as they are stronger and larger than does, yet more pliable than bucks. Similarly, wethers can work for weed control, where goats are used to browse in regions difficult for other ruminants to reach and will eat forage others won't touch. Ranchers interested in controlling brush often are not interested in breeding goats, making wethers a natural choice.

Many sheep ranchers who only have a single breeding ram keep it separate from the rest of the flock of ewes some or most of the time, but a lonely and discontented ram can cause problems. A sheep wether can provide companionship for the ram and keep it stable and productive.

When keeping goats as pets, wethers are generally preferred due to the ease in raising them. Intact male bucks are notoriously smelly to humans during the rut, and will urinate on nearby objects and themselves. Wethers avoid these issues.

== Castration process and risks ==
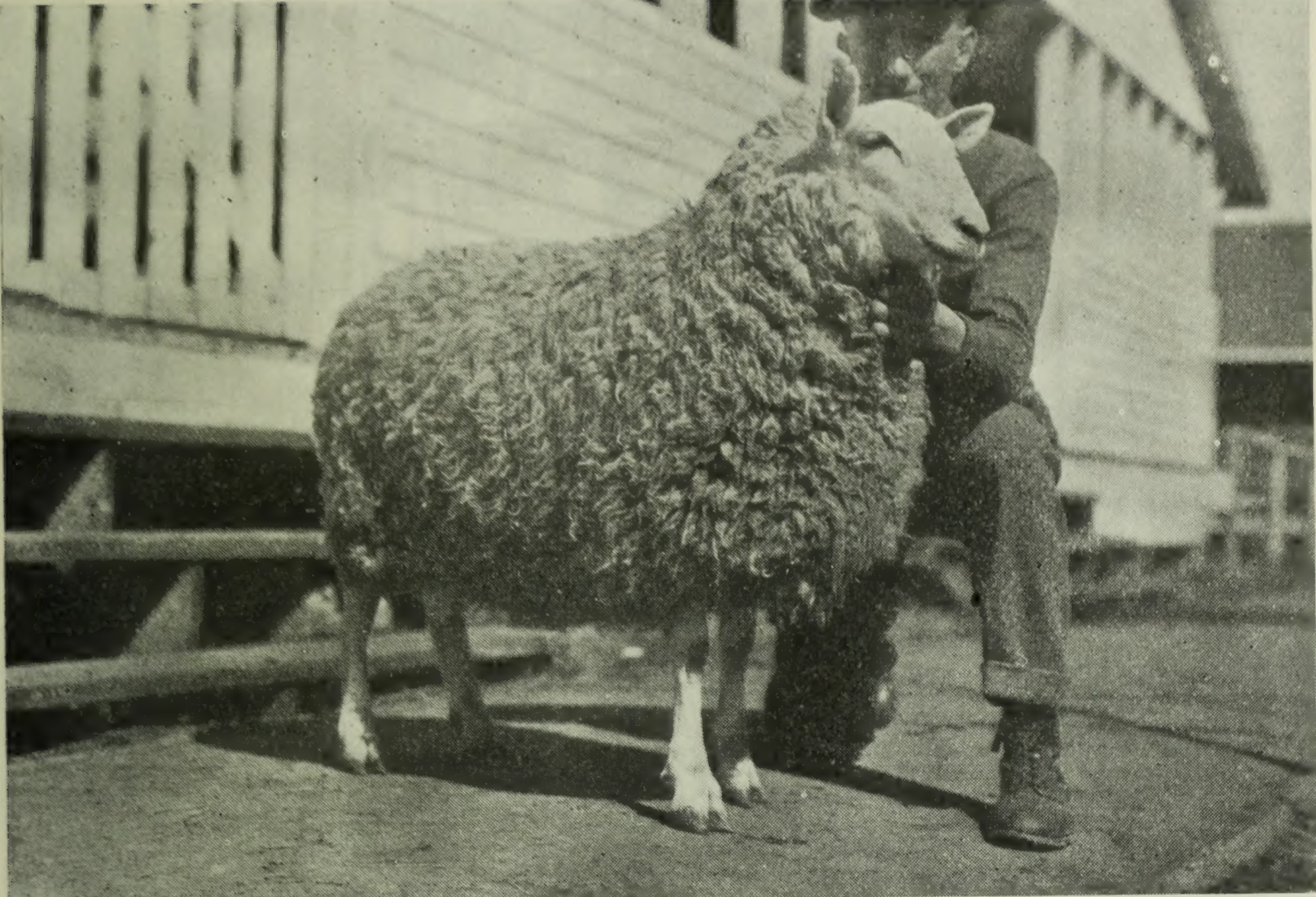
A Cheviot sheep wether in Alberta, from around 1926

There are three different common ways to create a wether. Surgical castration simply uses a scalpel or emasculator to cut out the testicles. A Burdizzo crushes the blood vessels supplying the testicles, causing them to wither. In elastration, tight rubber bands are placed over the scrotum and above the testes, until eventually the testicles atrophy and fall off weeks later.

Castration can increase the risk of tetanus due to creating a wound for Clostridium tetani to enter. Tetanus vaccines are recommended. Similarly, parasites such as screwworms are a greater risk immediately after castration as well. Castrated sheep run the risk of flystrike and maggots getting in the wound, especially in warm weather. Fly repellant or simply avoiding warm weather months for the procedure can mitigate the issue.

If a ram is castrated at less than 4 weeks of age, this can increase the risk of urinary calculi ("water belly", urolithiasis), as the urethra does not grow to its intended size. This leaves the wether more vulnerable if stones form in the urinary tract, e.g. due to a diet overly high in calcium or phosphates.

Older practice would sometimes perform both the castration process and docking (tail-shortening) of a lamb at the same time, although given that docking is usually done to lambs only a week or two old, this contrasts with later advice to wait somewhat longer before castrating.

== Teaser rams and teaser bucks ==
Teaser rams can be used to better control the estrus cycle in female sheep. They are usually not wethers, but are rather fully intact males which have been vasectomized. Wethers can still be used for this purpose, albeit generally after treating them with a sex hormone injection. Releasing a 'teaser ram' among the flock three weeks before planned breeding can speed up the cycle and synchronize upcoming planned pregnancies. This can ensure all or most of the females are in estrus (heat) by the time the real rams are released.

Among goats, teaser bucks are similarly usually intact males which have been vasectomized. They retain the same sex drive as males intended for breeding, but cannot actually get any does pregnant. They are used in speeding up and controlling the estrus cycle, as does will enter estrus more quickly in the presence of eager males. They are also used to detect females who did not successfully get pregnant, as they will continue trying to mate with them. Similar to sheep, giving goat wethers an injection of sex hormones such as estrogen and testosterone activates futile mating behaviors that allow them to be used in the role of teaser buck. While castration removes the breeding drive, goat wethers will still occasionally mount females, even when not hormone-treated.

== Bibliography ==
- Abbott, Kym (2018). The Practice of Sheep Veterinary Medicine (PDF). University of Adelaide Press.
- Belanger, Jerry; Bredesen, Sara Thomson (2018). Storey's Guide to Raising Dairy Goats (5th ed.). Storey Publishing. ISBN 9781612129334.
- Ensminger, Marion E. (2002). Sheep & Goat Science (6th ed.). Interstate Publishers. ISBN 0-8134-3116-6.
- Ryder, Michael Lawson (2007) [1983]. Sheep & Man. Duckworth. ISBN 978-0-7156-3647-3.
- Simmons, Paula; Ekarius, Carol (2009). Storey's Guide to Raising Sheep (4th ed.). Storey Publishing. ISBN 978-1-60342-459-2.
- Sheep Production Handbook (8th ed.). American Sheep Industry Association. 2015. ISBN 978-0-9742857-6-4.
