= Julius Work Calendar =

Earliest surviving calendar in England

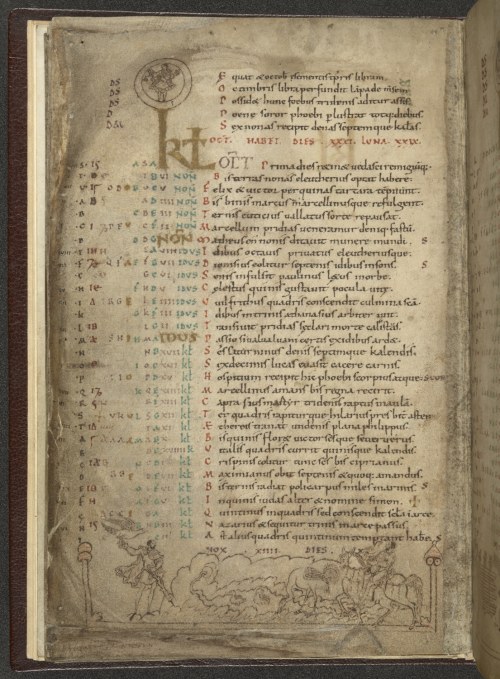
The calendar page for October; note the "Oct. habst dies XXXI"

The Julius Work Calendar is the earliest surviving calendar in England. It was written on parchment at Canterbury Cathedral in around 1020, and is a valuable primary source of Anglo-Saxon history. After the dissolution of the monasteries it was salvaged by Sir Robert Cotton and kept in the Cotton Library; the "Julius" in its name is a reference to where it was stored in Cotton's library. Since 2000 it has been stored in the British Museum, catalogued as Cotton MS Julius A VI. It is written in Medieval Latin.

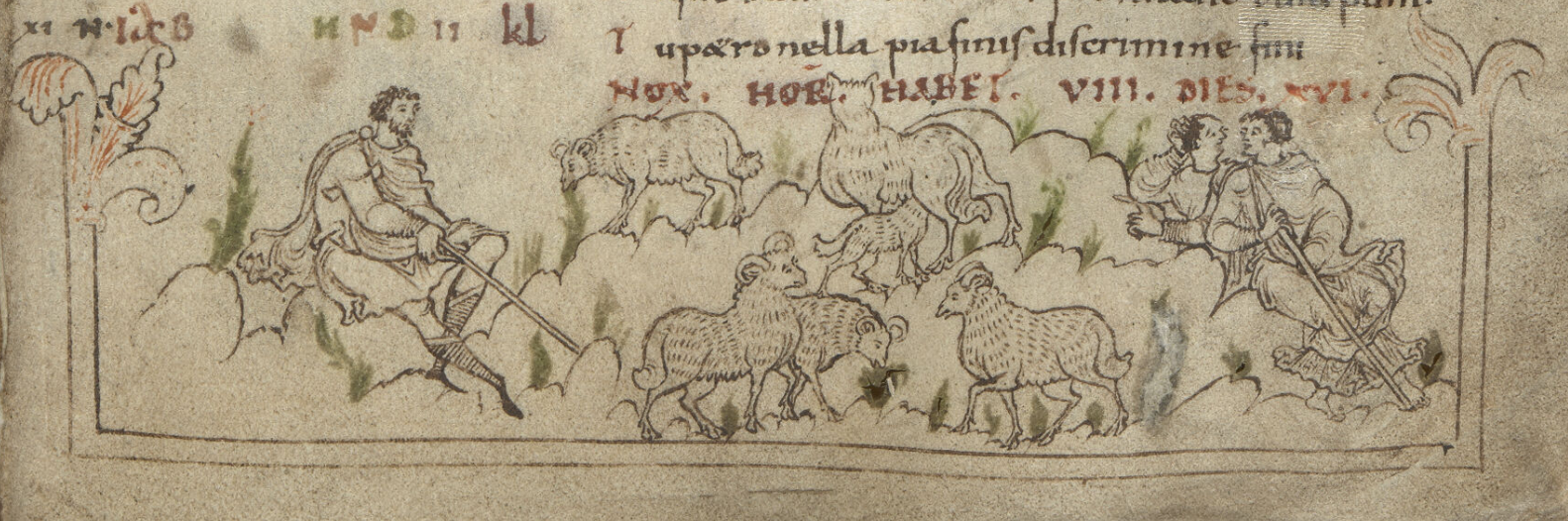
The calendar is illustrated; this footer image for the month of May shows shepherds tending sheep. A lamb is suckling at a ewe, and the other sheep are probably wethers kept for shearing their wool.
