= Castration =

Surgical or chemical action that removes use of testicles

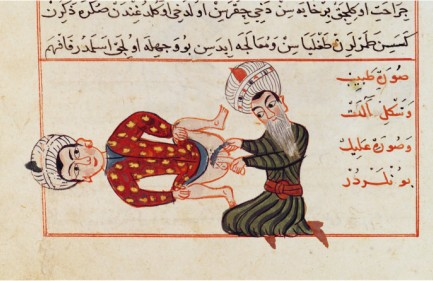
A 15th century Ottoman medical illustration by Sabuncuoğlu Şerafeddin depicting an operation for castration

Castration is any action, surgical, chemical, or otherwise, that disables the function of testes in males: the male gonad. Surgical castration is bilateral orchiectomy (excision of both testicles), while chemical castration uses pharmaceutical drugs to deactivate the testes. Some forms of castration cause sterilization (permanently preventing the castrated person or animal from reproducing); it also greatly reduces the production of sex hormones, such as testosterone and estrogen. Surgical castration in animals is often called neutering.

Castration has been used by humans for various types of slavery, such as in the eunuchs of the Ottoman Empire, as well as a terror tactic in warfare. It was incorporated into Chinese law during the Zhou dynasty. In the United States, Thomas Jefferson wrote and proposed a bill in Virginia reducing the punishment for rape, polygamy, or sodomy from death to castration. Although it ultimately failed to pass for free citizens, by Virginia law a slave attempting to rape a White woman could be castrated.

Castration of animals is intended to favor a desired physical development of the animal or of its behavior, or to prevent overpopulation. The parallel of castration for female animals is spaying.

The term castration may also be sometimes used to refer to emasculation where both the testicles and the penis are removed together. In some cultures, and in some translations, no distinction is made between the two.

== History ==
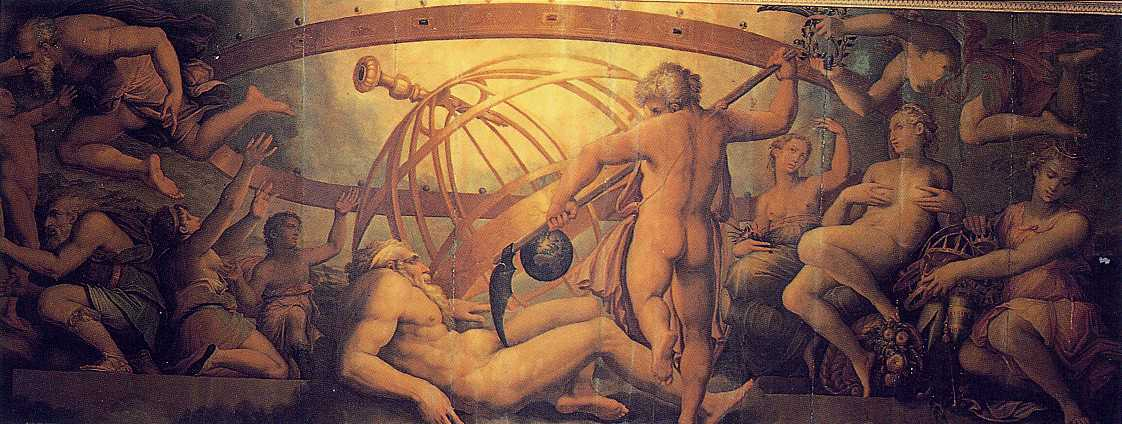
The Castration of Uranus: fresco by Vasari and Cristofano Gherardi (c. 1560, Sala di Cosimo I, Palazzo Vecchio, Florence)

Castration may have arisen in the Neolithic period in response to animal husbandry, rising populations, and population specialisation.

Either surgical removal of both testicles or chemical castration may be carried out in the case of prostate cancer. Testosterone-depletion treatment (either surgical removal of both testicles or chemical castration) is used to slow down the cancer. Surgical removal of one or both testicles, known as orchidectomy, is the most common treatment for testicular cancer.

Castration has also been used in the United States on sex offenders as a way of averting their incarceration.

Involuntary castration appears in the history of warfare, sometimes used by one side to torture or demoralize their enemies.

=== Africa and the Middle East ===
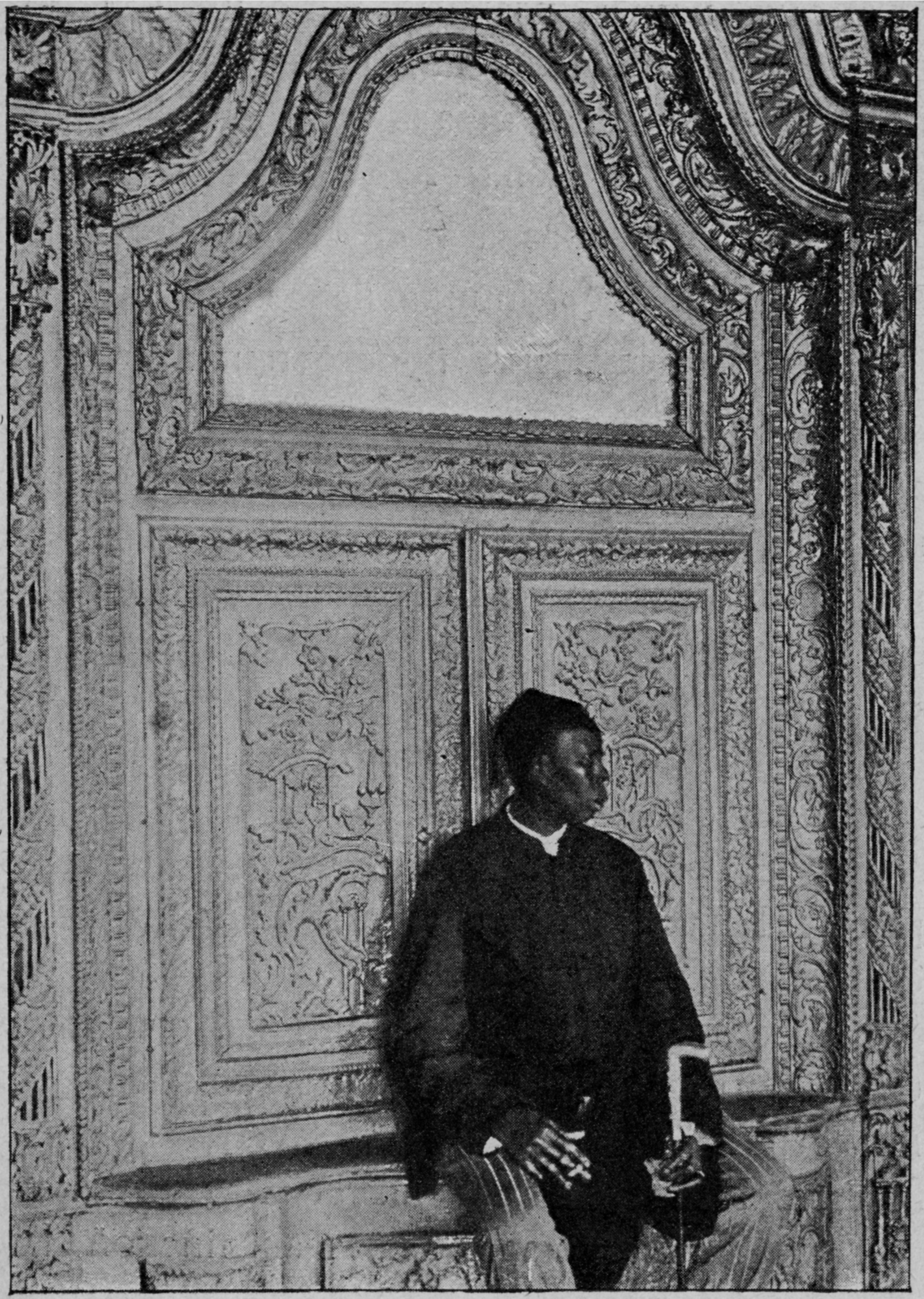
Chief Eunuch of Abdul Hamid II (1912)

The Caliphate in Baghdad at the beginning of the 10th Century had 7,000 black eunuchs and 4,000 white eunuchs in his palace." The Arab slave trade typically dealt in the sale of castrated male slaves. Black boys at the age of eight to twelve had their penises and scrota completely amputated. Reportedly, about two out of three boys died, but those who survived drew high prices.

=== Europe ===
==== Slavery ====
The employment or enslavement of eunuchs (castrated men) was practiced in classical and Roman antiquity and continued into the Middle Ages. In the 10th century, slave traders in Verdun in France and in Becâne (Pechina), Spain, castrated captives who were then enslaved as harem attendants in Al-Andalus.

==== Punishment ====
Edward Gibbon's Decline and Fall of the Roman Empire reports castration of defeated Byzantine Greeks at the hands of the Frankish marquis Theobald of Camerino and Spoleto in the course of 10th-century wars in Italy. By contrast the Byzantines themselves frequently castrated their rivals believing this would strip them of status, since a perfect emperor was expected to reflect heavenly authority. Mutilation, including castration legally disqualified a rival from ever achieving ascension to the throne forever, because a "blemished" man could not rule. Gibbon also alludes to a 12th-century incident set out in William Fitzstephen's Vita Sancti Thomae (Life of St. Thomas) in which Geoffrey of Anjou castrated the members of the cathedral chapter of Sens as a punishment for disobedience. In the medieval kingdom of Georgia, the 12th-century pretender Demna was castrated by his uncle George III of Georgia to ensure the supremacy of George's branch of the family. Another victim of castration was the 12th-century medieval French philosopher, scholar, teacher, and (later) monk Pierre Abélard. He was castrated by relatives of his lover, Héloïse. Bishop Wimund, a 12th-century English adventurer and invader of the Scottish coast, was blinded and castrated after losing a power struggle. In medieval England, men found guilty of high treason were hanged, drawn and quartered, which often included emasculation (removal of the genitalia).

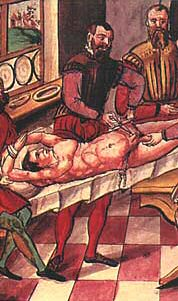
The procedure of castration as punishment during the 16th century

==== Modern era ====
Wim Deetman was criticized by the Dutch parliament for excluding evidence of castration in his report on sexual abuse by the Roman Catholic Church, where ten children were allegedly "punished" by castration in the 1950s for reporting sexual abuse by Roman Catholic priests. The Deetman Commission had rejected it as the person who reported the incident admitted it was speculative.

In Spain, a law against castration was used to deny sex-reassignment surgery to transgender people until the Penal Code was reformed in 1983.

=== China ===
According to legend, during the reign of the legendary Emperor Shun and Yu in China, in 2281 BC, castration was passed into law as a punishment, remaining so until the reign of Gaozu of Tang (618–626 AD). However, it was still practiced after his reign. According to historians, it was incorporated into Chinese law during the Zhou dynasty. It was one of the five physical punishments that could be legally inflicted on criminals in China.

Records of castrations in China date to the Shang dynasty (c. 1700–1050 BC), when the Shang kings castrated prisoners of war.

During the reign of Mu of the Zhou dynasty (10th c. BC) the Minister of Crime, Marquis Lu, reformed the law in 950 BC to make it easier for people to be sentenced to castration instead of death. This practice included not only the removal of the testicles but also the penis: both organs were cut off with a knife at the same time.

Men were castrated and made into state slaves during the Qin dynasty (221–206 BC) to perform forced labor for projects such as the Terracotta Army. The Qin government confiscated the property and enslaved the families of rapists who received castration as a punishment. Men punished with castration during the Han dynasty were also used as slave labor.

In the Han dynasty (206 BC–220 AD), castration continued to be used as a punishment for various offences. Chinese historian Sima Qian was castrated by order of the Han Emperor of China for dissent. In another incident multiple people, including a chief scribe and his underlings, were subjected to castration.

During the early part of the Ming dynasty (1368–1644 AD), China demanded eunuchs to be sent as tribute from Korea. Some of them oversaw the Korean concubines in the harem of the Chinese Emperor.

When the Chinese overthrew Mongol rule, many Mongol captives were castrated and turned into eunuchs. When the Ming army finally captured Yunnan from Mongols in 1382, thousands of prisoners were killed and, according to the custom in times of war, their young sons—including Zheng He—were castrated.

During the Miao Rebellions (Ming dynasty), Chinese commanders castrated thousands of Miao boys when their tribes revolted, and then distributed them as eunuch slaves as gifts to various officials.

At the end of the Ming dynasty, there were about 70,000 eunuchs (宦官 huànguān, or 太監 tàijiàn) employed by the emperor, with some serving inside the Forbidden City.

The last imperial eunuch in China was Sun Yaoting who died in 1996.

==== Non-Han peoples in China ====
The Khitan people adopted the practice of using eunuchs from the Chinese and the eunuchs used were non-Khitan prisoners of war. The Khitan were a nomadic Mongolic people and originally did not have eunuchs as part of their culture. When the Khitan founded the Liao dynasty they developed a harem system with concubines and wives and adopted eunuchs as part of it. All of the eunuchs captured were ethnic Chinese from the Central Plains that came from two sources. The Khitan captured Chinese people who were already eunuchs at the Jin court when they invaded the Later Jin. Another source was during their war with the Chinese Song dynasty: the Khitan would raid China, capture Han Chinese boys as prisoners of war and emasculate them to become eunuchs. The emasculation of captured Chinese boys guaranteed a continuous supply of eunuchs to serve in the Liao dynasty harem. The Empress Dowager Xiao Chuo (Chengtian) played a large role in the raids to capture and emasculate the boys.

Chengtian took power at age 30 in 982 as a regent for her son. Some reports suggest that she personally led her own army against the Song Chinese in 986. Her army defeated them in battle, fighting the retreating Chinese army. She then ordered the castration of around 100 ethnic Chinese boys she had captured in China, supplementing the Khitan's supply of eunuchs to serve at her court, among them was Wang Ji'en. The boys were all under ten years old and were selected for their good looks.

The History of Liao described and praised Empress Chengtian's capture and mass castration of the Chinese boys in a biography on Wang Ji'en.

Some legends say that the Mongol Genghis Khan was castrated by a Tangut princess using a knife, who wanted revenge against his treatment of the Tanguts and to stop him from raping her.

During the Qing dynasty (1644–1911 AD), the sons and grandsons of the rebel Yaqub Beg in China were all sentenced to castration. Surviving members of Yaqub Beg's family included his four sons, four grandchildren (two grandsons and two granddaughters), and four wives. They either died in prison in Lanzhou, Gansu, or were killed by the Chinese. His sons Yima Kuli, K'ati Kuli, Maiti Kuli, and grandson Aisan Ahung were the only survivors in 1879. They were all underage children, and put on trial, sentenced to an agonizing death if they were complicit in their father's rebellious "sedition", or if they were innocent of their fathers crimes, were to be sentenced to castration and serving as eunuch slaves to Chinese troops, when they reached 11 years old, and handed over to the Imperial Household to be executed or castrated. Although some sources assert that the sentence of castration was carried out, official sources from the US State Department and activists involved in the incident state that Yaqub Beg's son and grandsons had their sentence commuted to life imprisonment with a fund provided for their support.

=== Korea ===
The eunuchs of Korea, called Naesi (Korean: 내시; Hanja: 內侍), were officials to the king and other royalty in traditional Korean society. The first recorded appearance of a Korean eunuch was in Goryeosa ("History of Goryeo"), a compilation about the Goryeo period. In 1392, with the founding of the Joseon dynasty, the Naesi system was revised, and the department was renamed the "Department of Naesi" (내시부; 內侍府).

The Naesi system included two ranks, those of Sangseon (상선; 尙膳, "Chief of Naesi"), who held the official title of senior second rank, and Naegwan (내관; 內官, "Common official naesi"), both of which held rank as officers. 140 naesi in total served the palace in Joseon dynasty period. They also took the exam on Confucianism every month. The naesi system was repealed in 1894 following Gabo reform.

According to legend, castration consisted of daubing a boy's genitals with human feces and having a dog bite them off. During the Yuan dynasty, eunuchs became a desirable commodity for tributes, and dog bites were replaced by more sophisticated surgical techniques.

=== Vietnam ===
The Vietnamese adopted the eunuch system and castration techniques from China. Records show that the Vietnamese performed castration in a painful procedure by removing the entire genitalia with both penis and testicles being cut off with a sharp knife or metal blade. The procedure was agonizing since the entire penis was cut off. The young man's thighs and abdomen would be tied, and others would pin him down on a table. The genitals would be washed with pepper water and then cut off. A tube would be then be inserted into the urethra to allow urination during healing. Many Vietnamese eunuchs were products of self-castration in order to gain access to the palaces and power. In other cases, they might be paid to become eunuchs. They served in many capacities, from supervising public works to investigating crimes, to reading public proclamations.

Lý Thường Kiệt was a prominent eunuch general during the Lý dynasty (1009–1225).

The Trần dynasty sent Vietnamese boy eunuchs as tribute to Ming dynasty China several times, in 1383, 1384 and 1385 Nguyen Dao, Nguyen Toan, Tru Ca, and Ngo Tin were among several Vietnamese eunuchs sent to China.

During the Fourth Chinese domination of Vietnam, the Ming Chinese under the Yongle Emperor castrated many young Vietnamese boys, choosing them for their handsomeness and ability, and brought them to Nanjing to serve as eunuchs. Among them were the architect-engineer Nguyễn An and Nguyen Lang. Vietnamese were among the many eunuchs of different origins found at Yongle's court. Among the eunuchs in charge of the Capital Battalions of Beijing was Xing An, a Vietnamese.

In the Lê dynasty the Vietnamese Emperor Lê Thánh Tông was aggressive in his relations with foreign countries including China. A large amount of trade between Guangdong and Vietnam happened during his reign. Early accounts recorded that the Vietnamese captured Chinese whose ships had blown off course and detained them. Young Chinese men were selected by the Vietnamese for castration to become eunuch slaves to the Vietnamese. It has been speculated by modern historians that the Chinese who were captured and castrated by the Vietnamese were involved in trade between China and Vietnam instead of actually being blown off course by the wind and they were punished as part of a crackdown on foreign trade by Vietnam.

Several Malay envoys from the Malacca sultanate were attacked and captured in 1469 by the Lê dynasty of Annam (Vietnam) as they were returning to Malacca from China. The Vietnamese enslaved and castrated the young from among the captured.

A 1472 entry in the Ming Shilu reported that when some Chinese from Nanhai county escaped back to China after their ship had been blown off course into Vietnam, where they had been forced to serve as soldiers in Vietnam's military. The escapees also reported that they found out up to 100 Chinese men remained captives in Vietnam after they were caught and castrated by the Vietnamese after their ships were blown off course into Vietnam. The Chinese Ministry of Revenue responded by ordering Chinese civilians and soldiers to stop going abroad to foreign countries. China's relations with Vietnam during this period were marked by the punishment of prisoners by castration.

A 1499 entry in the Ming Shilu recorded that 13 Chinese men from Wenchang including a young man named Wu Rui were captured by the Vietnamese after their ship was blown off course while traveling from Hainan to Guangdong's Qin subprefecture (Qinzhou), after which they ended up near the coast of Vietnam, during the Chenghua Emperor's rule (1447–1487). Twelve of them were enslaved to work as agricultural laborers, while the youngest, Wu Rui was selected for castration since he was the only young man and he became a eunuch attendant at the Vietnamese imperial palace in Thang Long. After years of service, he was promoted at the death of the Vietnamese ruler in 1497 to a military position in northern Vietnam. A soldier told him of an escape route back to China and Wu Rui escaped to Longzhou. The local chief planned to sell him back to the Vietnamese, but Wu was rescued by the Pingxiang magistrate and then was sent to Beijing to work as a eunuch in the palace.

The Đại Việt sử ký toàn thư records that in 1467 in An Bang province of Dai Viet (now Quảng Ninh Province) a Chinese ship blew off course onto the shore. The Chinese were detained and not allowed to return to China as ordered by Le Thanh Tong. This incident may be the same one where Wu Rui was captured.

In the Nguyễn dynasty the poet Hồ Xuân Hương mocked eunuchs in her poem as a stand-in for criticizing the government.

Commoners were banned from undergoing castration in Vietnam; only adult men of high social rank could be castrated. Most eunuchs were born as such with a congenital abnormality. The Vietnamese government mandated that boys born with defective genitalia were to be reported to officials, in exchange for the town being freed from mandatory labor requirements. The boy would have the option of serving as a eunuch official or serving the palace women when he became ten years old. This law was put in place in 1838 during the Nguyễn dynasty. The only males allowed inside the Forbidden City at Huế were the Emperor and his eunuchs.

The presence of eunuchs in Vietnam was used by the French colonizers to degrade the Vietnamese.

=== Americas ===
In 1778, Thomas Jefferson wrote a bill in Virginia reducing the punishment for rape, polygamy, or sodomy from death to castration. Over the years, several U.S. states have passed laws regarding chemical castration for sex offenders but not one state has mandatory castration. In 2016, Alabama lawmaker Steve Hurst proposed a bill requiring certain sex offenses to require the perpetrator be castrated prior to their release from state custody.

A 1969 study found that men institutionalized at the same facility in Kansas lived an extra 14 years, on average, if they were castrated.

In 1983, Judge C. Victor Pyle sentenced three men convicted of rape to choose between 30 years in prison or castration. The South Carolina Supreme Court ruled that the castration option would be cruel, however, and the men were sentenced to prison.

== Prevention of crime ==
Chemical or surgical castration is practiced in many countries for people convicted of sex crimes as a prerequisite for their release from prison. The castration may be voluntary or mandated. The assumption is that it prevents future crimes. Reports are available from American and European countries for over 80 years (chemical for circa 30). The effectiveness and ethics of this treatment are heavily debated.

A temporary "chemical castration" has been studied and developed as a preventive measure and punishment for several repeated sex crimes, such as rape or other sexually related violence. Where homosexuality has been criminalised or treated as a mental illness, chemical castration has been used on gay men, as in the case of Alan Turing.

In modern times, the Czech Republic practices surgical castration of convicted sex offenders. According to the reports compiled by Council of Europe, a human-rights forum, the central European country physically castrated at least 94 prisoners in the 10 years up to April 2008. The Czech Republic defends this procedure as voluntary and effective. According to Dr. Martin Hollý, director of the Psychiatric Hospital Bohnice in Prague, none of the nearly 100 sex offenders who had been physically castrated had committed further offences. One serial offender stated that being castrated was the "best decision" he ever made: "On the one hand you have to protect the potential victims and on the other hand I wanted to be protected from myself, I wanted to live like a normal person." Don Grubin, a professor at Newcastle University's Institute of Neuroscience who also runs a chemical castration program backed by the UK's Ministry of Justice, was initially opposed to physical castration. After visiting the Czech Republic, however, he agreed that some form of castration might be of benefit to some sex offenders.

In 2020, the Pakistani-controlled section of Kashmir passed a bill allowing for convicted child sex abusers to be chemically or surgically castrated.

In 2020, a motion calling for surgical castration of convicted rapists was defeated in the Nigerian House of Representatives. However, there remains support for the policy. In the same year, the Kaduna State House of Assembly amends the state's Penal Code that mandates courts to sentence child rapists to castration before execution.

In 2024, Louisiana became the first U.S. state to allow judges to impose chemical castration on sex offenders. Previously, in several states, convicted offenders could choose castration, including where it was a prerequisite for parole. However, should the person choose to remain in prison, they would not be forced to be castrated.

=== Criticism ===
Some criminologists argue that the reported lower recidivism rates in castrated male sex offenders compared to non-castrated ones does not conclusively prove that it is a biological effect of castration, but might be explained by other factors. One suggested factor from game theory is that men who are willing to accept castration to get a shorter prison sentence are those who value freedom from prison higher than men who are not willing to pay the price for freedom in the form of their testicles. This hypothesis could explain their apparent lower recidivism as a result of working harder to conceal the evidence for their crimes, and argue that their parole is a danger of releasing offenders who only hide their crimes more efficiently and are not any less likely to commit new crimes. These criminologists also argue that police investigators treating castrated men as less likely to reoffend than non-castrated men may cause an investigation bias and self-fulfilling prophecy.

== Castration as a weapon of war ==
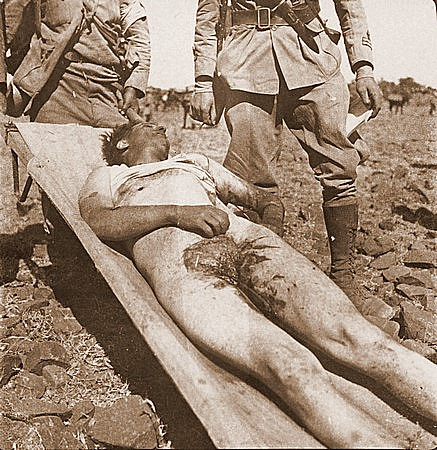
An Italian soldier who was castrated and emasculated during the Second Italo-Ethiopian War.

Castration and other forms of male genital mutilation have been practiced against enemy soldiers and civilians from ancient times to the twenty-first century. Sometimes it is practiced against living boys and men and other times against corpses.

The castration of defeated enemies and the taking of body parts as trophies were traditional in Ethiopia, and Ethiopian forces practiced castration and emasculation during the Second Italo-Ethiopian War (1935–1937). Italian aviator Tito Minniti was allegedly one victim of this practice.

One British RAF officer, G. C. Gardiner DSO DFC, is recorded as having been castrated after a crash landing in Syria. During the Mau Mau uprising, there were reported instances of British security forces castrating Kenyan detainees in internment camps.

In Europe during the Yugoslav Wars from 1991 onwards, Bosnian prisoners of war were castrated. According to the statements of victims and eyewitnesses, 32 Serbian women were allegedly tasked with castrating them by cutting off their organs with razor blades.

A video released during the 2022 Russian invasion of Ukraine appeared to show Russian soldiers castrating a Ukrainian captive with a box cutter. This led to a wave of international condemnation against the Russian military for its use of torture in wartime. Many other cases of Russian troops castrating Ukrainian prisoners of war have also emerged. According to the prosecutors, 101 cases of sexual violence against Ukrainian men by occupying Russian forces have been recorded, including 50 in the Kherson region. But this is almost certainly a vast undercount, since experts say men are often reluctant to report sexual violence.

When Ukrainian cities were liberated, numerous abuses by Russian forces were exposed, including castrations, in attempts to terrorize and demoralize the Ukrainian population to break their will to fight.

== Music ==
In Europe, when women were not permitted to sing in church or cathedral choirs in the Roman Catholic Church, boys were castrated to develop a special high voice and to prevent their voices breaking at puberty. The first documents mentioning castrati are Italian church records from the 1550s. In the baroque and classical music eras these singers were highly appreciated by opera composers as well. Mozart's Exultate Jubilate, Allegri's Miserere and other pieces from this period now sung by sopranos and countertenors were written for castrati. Some of the alto parts of Handel's Messiah were first sung by a castrato. Castrati include Farinelli, Senesino, Carestini, and Caffarelli. The last true castrato was Alessandro Moreschi (1858–1922) who served in the Sistine Chapel Choir. It was not until the late 19th century that the Roman Catholic Church officially condemned the production of castrati. In modern times, the Mexican Javier Medina is the only professional opera singer who can perform as a castrato, since he had an involuntary chemical castration, as a result of a cancer treatment that he had before he reached puberty.

== Religion ==
=== Hinduism ===
In South Asia, many hijras live in well-defined, organized, all-hijra communities, led by a guru. The power of the hijras as a sexually ambiguous category can only be understood in the religious context of Hinduism. In some Hindu beliefs, ritual, and art, the power of the combined man/woman, or androgyne, is a frequent and significant theme. Bahuchara Mata, the main object of hijra veneration, is specifically associated with transgender topics.

=== Christianity ===
In the Gospel of Matthew, Jesus of Nazareth mentions castration in a discussion about avoiding adultery and divorce that some are involuntarily castrated or born that way, while some others "make themselves eunuchs" willingly out of a desire to be chaste (Matthew 19:1–12). Given Jesus' frequent use of metaphor and hyperbole, e.g. Luke 9:62, the Catholic Church has broadly discouraged any understanding of this passage as recommending literal "self-castration". That is consistent with Jesus' claims (as a rabbi) to uphold the Law given to Moses, e.g. Matthew 5:17, a Law which also discouraged literal castration Deut 23:1. However, in his own comments Jesus had no condemnation for any of the above. In Acts 8:34–8:39, a eunuch is baptized by Philip the Evangelist, demonstrating acceptance of castrated individuals in his church.

The first canon of the First Council of Nicaea in 325 AD forbade clergy members to voluntarily castrate themselves "when in perfect health", but freely accepted those who had been either castrated by others against their will, castrated due to a medical sickness or necessity, or those born as eunuchs.

Paul, arguing against self-righteousness regarding circumcision in Galatians 5:12, says "As for those agitators, I wish they would go the whole way and emasculate themselves!" (NIV)

Well-known Christian eunuchs (or alleged eunuchs) include:

- Origen, who is reported by Eusebius to have castrated himself based on his reading of the Gospel of Matthew 19:12 and other passages in Matthew and Mark that appear to endorse voluntary amputation to avoid sin, although there is some doubt concerning this story. Schaff considers the account genuine but cites Baur et al. in opposition. Origen argues against such literal interpretations of the passages from Matthew and Mark in his First Principles.
- Bishop Melito of Sardis (d. ca 180), who was a eunuch, according to the church history of Eusebius of Caesarea, though, significantly the word "virgin" was substituted in Rufinus' Latin translation of Eusebius.
- Boston Corbett, who was inspired by this same verse 19:12 to castrate himself (Corbett was the 19th-century American soldier who is generally believed to have fired the shot that killed John Wilkes Booth).
- Skoptsy, a branch of the Russian Spiritual Christianity movement founded in the 1760s.

=== Judaism ===
Judaism strictly forbids the castration of either humans or animals. Deuteronomy 23:1 expels castrated men from the assembly of Israel; they are forbidden to marry or if married must divorce from their wives (though permitting the castrated to marry or remain married to female converts to Judaism). The laws of castration also apply to cases of irreversible or un-reversed vasectomy and all other cases where the flow of sperm is known to have been placed into a permanent state of dysfunction with either no hope or no desire to take the steps to repair.

Isaiah 56:3–5 references in a positive welcoming manner eunuchs who follow after God's laws. "Neither let the son of the stranger, that hath joined himself to the LORD, speak, saying, The LORD hath utterly separated me from his people: neither let the eunuch say, Behold, I am a dry tree. For thus saith the LORD unto the eunuchs that keep my sabbaths, and choose the things that please me, and take hold of my covenant; Even unto them will I give in mine house and within my walls a place and a name better than of sons and of daughters: I will give them an everlasting name, that shall not be cut off."

According to Rashi, Kham (Ham) castrated his father Noah and was cursed as a result.

In Judaism, castrated animals are deemed unfit for sacrifice in the Temple in Jerusalem (Lev 22:24). Castrated members of the priestly caste are forbidden to enter certain parts of the temple, to approach the altar, or to make sacrifices, although they could eat their share of the offerings and receive the priestly and Levite gifts (Lev. 21:16–24).

=== Islam ===
The Muslim conquest of Persia as well as later conquests in the Byzantine Empire and India brought them into contact with eunuchs. By the eighth century, the palaces of the caliphs were staffed with many eunuch slaves which sold at a premium. A regular trade in eunuchs developed with slaves being taken to locations in Spain or Africa to be castrated, as the practice of castration was forbidden for Muslims. Eunuchs were used as harem supervisors, as mediators or servile roles, but they could also rise to be trusted advisors or military commanders.

In Islam, castration is considered a sin and strictly forbidden, whether one performs it on oneself or on another. In the history of slavery in the Muslim world, a fair proportion of male slaves were imported as eunuch. Levy states that according to the Quran and Islamic traditions, such emasculation was objectionable. Some jurists such as al-Baydawi considered castration to be mutilation, stipulating laws to prevent it. However, in practice, emasculation was frequent. In 18th century Mecca, the majority of eunuchs were in the service of the mosques.

== Medical consequences ==
A subject of castration who is altered before the onset of puberty will retain a high voice, as well as the effects of hypogonadism, which include non-muscular build, an infantile penis, a lack of a beard, more developed subcutaneous fat. He may be taller than average, with long limbs, so called "eunuchoid appearance", as the production of sex hormones in puberty—more specifically, estrogen via aromatization of testosterone—stops long bone growth in a process called osseous maturation. The subject may lack the male distribution of axillary hair, and may develop pubic hair distributed in female pattern. They may have a low sex drive or none at all.

Castration stops the progression of male pattern baldness. However, hair regrowth — if it occurs at all — may be limited to hair that was lost shortly before castration.

Historically, many eunuchs who additionally underwent a penectomy reportedly had urinary incontinence associated with the removal of the penis.

A study of 81 historical eunuchs in Korea's royal court found a 14- to 19-year increase in lifespan compared to intact men of similar socioeconomic background; these eunuchs had a centenarian rate of over 3%.

== Chemical castration ==
In the case of chemical castration, ongoing regular injections of anti-androgens are required. Chemical castration does not actually remove the testicles or ovaries of the subject, nor is it a form of sterilization.

With the advent of chemical castration, physical castration in humans has been widely superseded, though some have undergone the procedure voluntarily.

== Other animals ==
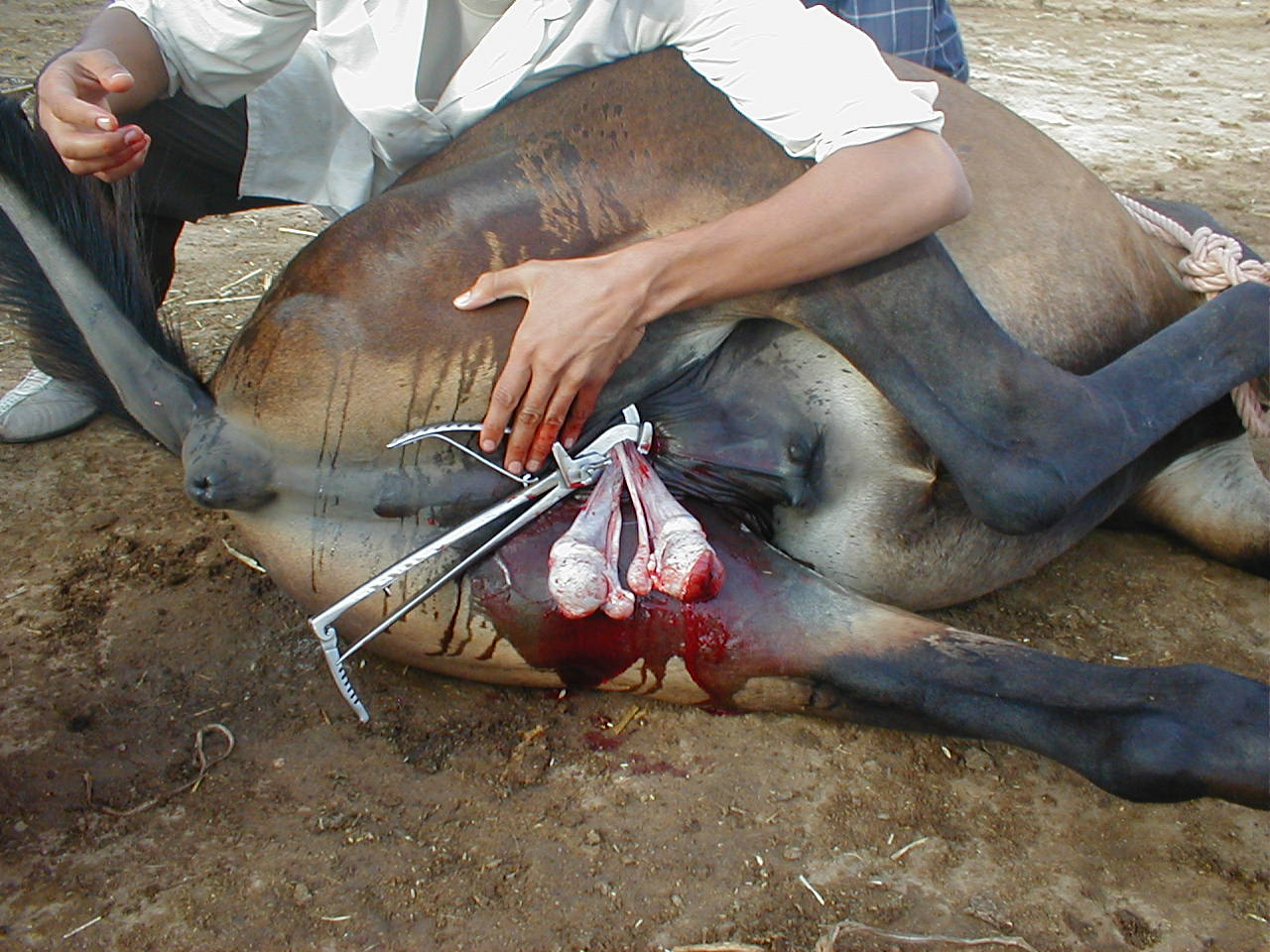
A mule being castrated

Humans commonly castrate domestic animals not intended for breeding. Domestic animals are usually castrated to avoid unwanted or uncontrolled reproduction; to reduce or prevent other manifestations of sexual behaviour such as defending the herd from humans and other threats, or intra-herd aggression (e.g. fighting between groups of entire (uncastrated) males of a species); or to reduce other consequences of sexual behavior that may make animal husbandry more difficult, such as boundary/fence/enclosure destruction when attempting to get to nearby females of the species.

Male horses are usually castrated (gelded) using emasculators, because stallions are rather aggressive and troublesome. The same applies to male mules, although they are sterile. Male cattle are castrated to improve fattening and docility in feedlots or for use as oxen. Breeding individuals are kept entire and used for breeding: they may fetch higher prices when sold.

Livestock may be castrated when used for food to prevent indiscriminate breeding, control aggression, and improve meat and carcass quality. In domestic pigs the undesirable odour or taint of uncastrated males, called boar taint, is caused by androstenone and skatole concentrations stored in the fat tissues of the animal after sexual maturity. Boar taint is only found in a small minority of pigs and can be controlled through breeding selection, diet and management. It is released when the fat is heated and has a distinct odor and flavor that is widely considered unpalatable to consumers. Consequently, in commercial meat production, male pigs are either castrated shortly after birth or slaughtered before they reach sexual maturity. Recent research in Brazil has shown that castration of pigs is unnecessary because most pigs do not have the 'boar taint'. This is due to many breeds of pigs simply not having the heredity for the boar taint and the fact that pigs are normally slaughtered at a young market weight.

In the case of pets, castration is usually called neutering, and is encouraged to prevent overpopulation of the community by unwanted animals, and to reduce certain diseases such as prostate disease and testicular cancer in male dogs (oophorectomy in female pets is often called spaying). Testicular cancer is rare in dogs, and also prostate problems are somewhat common in castrated male dogs when they get older. Neutered individuals have a much higher risk of developing prostate problems in comparison to intact males. Castrated male cats are more likely to develop an obstruction in their urethra, preventing them from urinating to some degree. A specialized vocabulary has arisen for neutered animals of given species:

- Barrow (pig)
- Bullock (cattle)
- Capon (chicken)
- Gelding (horse)
- Gib (cat, ferret)
- Ox (cattle) (Castration performed on mature bull)
- Stag (cattle, sheep)
- Steer (cattle) (Castration performed on young calf)
- Wether (sheep, goat)

An incompletely castrated male in livestock species (horse and cattle) is known as a rig.

The term stag is used for a male animal castrated after the secondary sex characteristics have developed to such a point as to give him the appearance of sexual maturity.

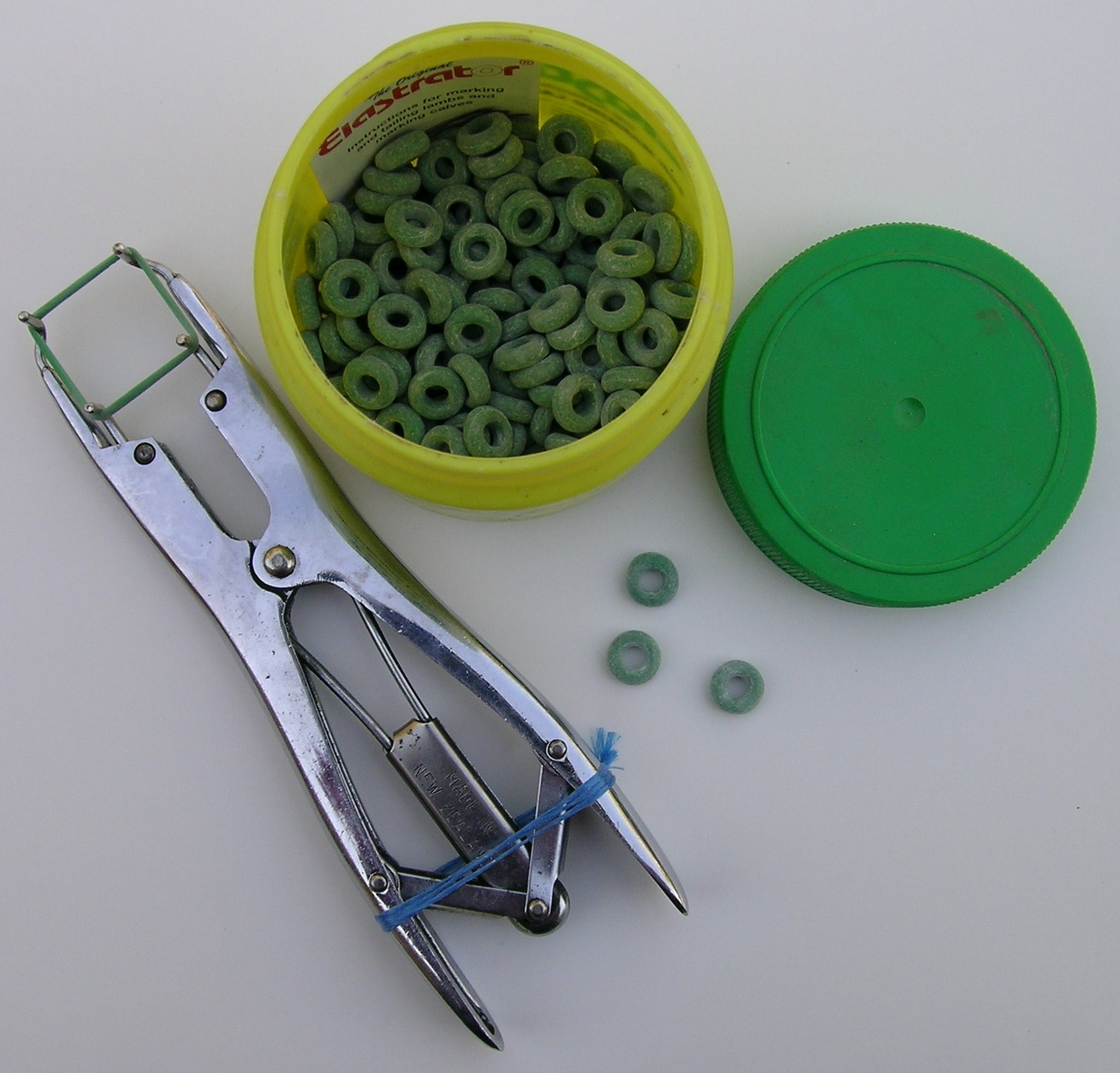
Rubber rings and pliers used in elastration

Methods of veterinary castration include instant surgical removal, the use of an elastrator tool to secure a band around the testicles that disrupts the blood supply, the use of a Burdizzo tool or emasculators to crush the spermatic cords and disrupt the blood supply, pharmacological injections and implants and immunological techniques to inoculate the animal against his own sexual hormones.

Certain animals, like horses and swine, are usually surgically treated with a scrotal castration (which can be done with the animal standing while sedated and after local anesthetic has been applied), while others, like dogs and cats, are anesthetised and recumbent when surgically castrated with a pre-scrotal incision in the case of dogs, or a pre-scrotal or scrotal incision used for cats.

Castration of cattle has historically been done without pain medications. All methods of castration cause pain and distress, which can be minimized by castrating as early as possible, preferably within the first week of life. The Canadian Code of Practice for the Care and Handling of Beef Cattle requires that, as of 2018, calves older than six months be castrated using pain control.

In veterinary practice an "open" castration refers to a castration in which the inguinal tunic is incised and not sutured. A "closed" castration refers to when the procedure is performed so that the inguinal tunic is sutured together after incision.

== Oophorectomy ==
The term castration also can be used to refer to Oophorectomy, where both the ovaries are removed in females.

== See also ==
- Ashley Treatment
- Birth control
- Castration anxiety
- Castrato, a castrated male singer
- Chemical castration
- Cleveland Torso Murderer, a serial killer who castrated his male victims
- Emasculation
- Emasculator
- Eunuch
- Gelding
- Inguinal orchiectomy, the approach typically used to treat testicular cancer
- Spaying and neutering (for animals)
- Parasitic castration
- Penectomy
- Penis removal
- Gender affirming surgery
- Vaginoplasty
- Vasectomy

== Bibliography ==
- Bauer, Susan Wise (2010). The History of the Medieval World: From the Conversion of Constantine to the First Crusade (illustrated ed.). W. W. Norton & Company. ISBN 978-0393078176.
- Cooke, Nola; Li, Tana; Anderson, James, eds. (2011). The Tongking Gulf Through History (illustrated ed.). University of Pennsylvania Press. ISBN 978-0812243369.
- Hathaway, Jane (11 October 2018). The Chief Eunuch of the Ottoman Harem: From African Slave to Power-Broker. Cambridge University Press. ISBN 9781107108295.
- Junne, George; Junne, George H. (2016). Black Eunuchs of the Ottoman Empire: Networks of Power in the Court of the Sultan. I. B. Tauris & Company, Limited. ISBN 9781784531546.
- Keay, John (2010). China: A History. HarperCollins UK. ISBN 978-0007372089.
- Lary, Diana (2007). Diana Lary (ed.). The Chinese State at the Borders (illustrated ed.). UBC Press. ISBN 978-0774813334.
- McMahon, Keith (2013). Women Shall Not Rule: Imperial Wives and Concubines in China from Han to Liao. Rowman & Littlefield Publishers. ISBN 978-1442222908.
- Peterson, Barbara Bennett, ed. (2000). Notable Women of China: Shang Dynasty to the Early Twentieth Century (illustrated ed.). M.E. Sharpe. ISBN 0765619296.
- Tsai, Shih-Shan Henry (1996). The Eunuchs in the Ming Dynasty (Ming Tai Huan Kuan) (illustrated ed.). SUNY Press. ISBN 0791426874.
- Tuotuo. Liaoshi [History of Liao]. Beijing: Zhonghua shuju, 1974 (or Tuotuo, Liaoshi (Beijing: Zhonghua shuju, 1974))
- Toqto'a; et al. (1344). Liao Shi (宋史) [History of Liao] (in Chinese).
- van de Ven, H. J., ed. (2000). Warfare in Chinese History. Sinica Leidensia V. 47 (illustrated ed.). BRILL. ISBN 9004117741.
- Wade, Geoff (2005), Southeast Asia in the Ming Shi-lu: an open access resource, Asia Research Institute and the Singapore E-Press, National University of Singapore
- Wang, Yuan-Kang (2013). Harmony and War: Confucian Culture and Chinese Power Politics (illustrated ed.). Columbia University Press. ISBN 978-0231522403.
- Patrick Barbier, The World of the Castrati: the History of an Extraordinary Operatic Phenomenon Souvenir, 1996, ISBN 0-285-63309-0
- Susan Elliott, Cutting Too Close for Comfort: Paul's Letter to the Galatians in Its Anatolian Cultic Context Reviews in Review of Biblical Literature
- Theresa McCuaig, "Understanding Castration." 2009.
- 祝建龙 (Zhu Jianlong) (April 2009). 辽代后宫制度研究 [Research on the System of Imperial Harem in the Liao Dynasty] (Master's) (in Chinese). 吉林大学 (Jilin University).
- English language Abstracts of the thesis
    - Research on the System of Imperial Harem in Liao Dynasty
    - Research on the System of Imperial Harem in Liao Dynasty
    - Research on the System of Imperial Harem in Liao Dynasty
