= Burdizzo =

Brand of castration devices

A 230 mm (9 in) Burdizzo, used primarily on goats, small calves, and sometimes on humans.

The Burdizzo is the name brand of a company that makes a castration device (an emasculatome) which employs a large clamp designed to break the blood vessels leading into the testicles. Once the blood supply to the testicles is lost, testicular necrosis occurs, and the testicles shrink, soften, and eventually deteriorate completely. When the device is used, the operator crushes the spermatic cords one at a time, leaving a space in between in order to prevent an interruption of blood-flow to the scrotum.

== Animals ==
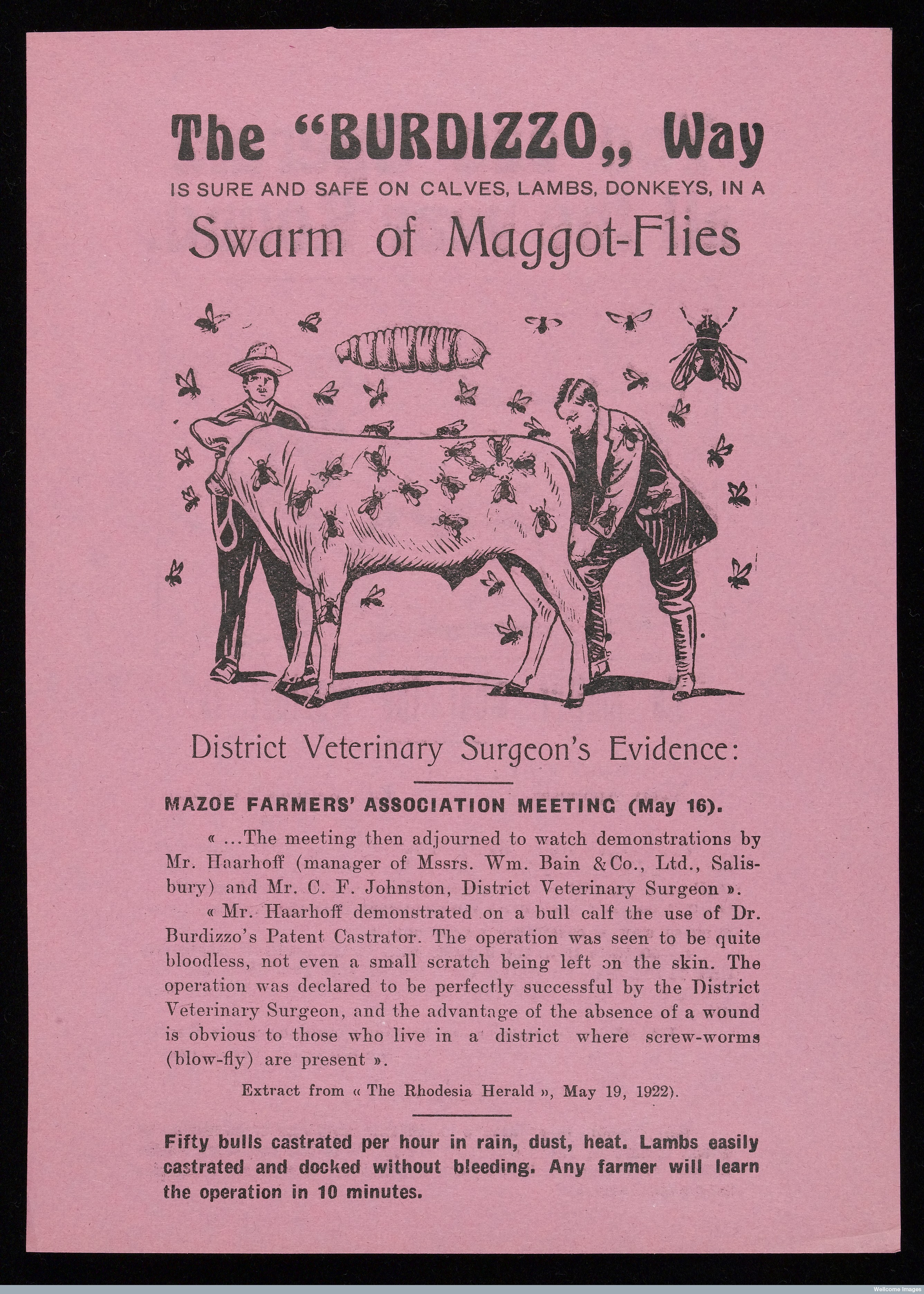
L0040408 Leaflet selling the "Burdizzo," a castration machine

The Burdizzo is used primarily on farm animals such as cattle, sheep, and goats. An appropriately-sized emasculatome should also be used depending on animal and size. The device should be disinfected and clean in case the skin is broken. Local anaesthesia plus a nonsteroidal anti-inflammatory drug are needed to eliminate acute pain caused by Burdizzo castration.

Castration via this method is an appealing approach because it seemingly causes less chronic pain than elastic banding and less acute pain than surgical castration, yet with all the benefits of bloodless castration in cattle. Some studies have reported less weight loss for calves castrated via this device versus surgical castration. The greatest advantage of the Burdizzo over other methods is that, because the spermatic cords are crushed within the scrotum, no open wound is exposed to the environment, protecting the injury from flies, dirty surroundings, and infectious agents. It's also bloodless with less reduction in weight gain after castration compared to surgical or latex-band.

There are a few disadvantages. It is unreliable when done incorrectly, which can lead to stags (a bull that has already developed some secondary sex characteristics). Equipment will become ineffective after long-term use and must be replaced. It can be slow to perform and requires expertise to prevent user errors that can occur. Castration failure due to tool operator error has been reported more often with this method than for other methods. Swiss researchers reported calves castrated with this device when younger than 12 to 16 weeks may retain functional testes. It is not known why it may happen. It has been proposed that it fails either due to spermatic cord being too small to crush or due to regeneration. Misidentification of spermatic cords has also been cited as a reason for less reliability. The device might also fail due to not being held for the appropriate time (10 seconds for cattle; 15-20 for goats).

== Humans ==
Burdizzos have also been used by some human males as a means of self-castration. Though it lessens the risk of infection as no skin is broken, it is considered unsafe for humans, as the Burdizzo was not originally designed for human use, and causes blunt force trauma to the spermatic cords, which are thickly wrapped in nerve fibres.
