= Emasculator =

Tool used in the castration of livestock

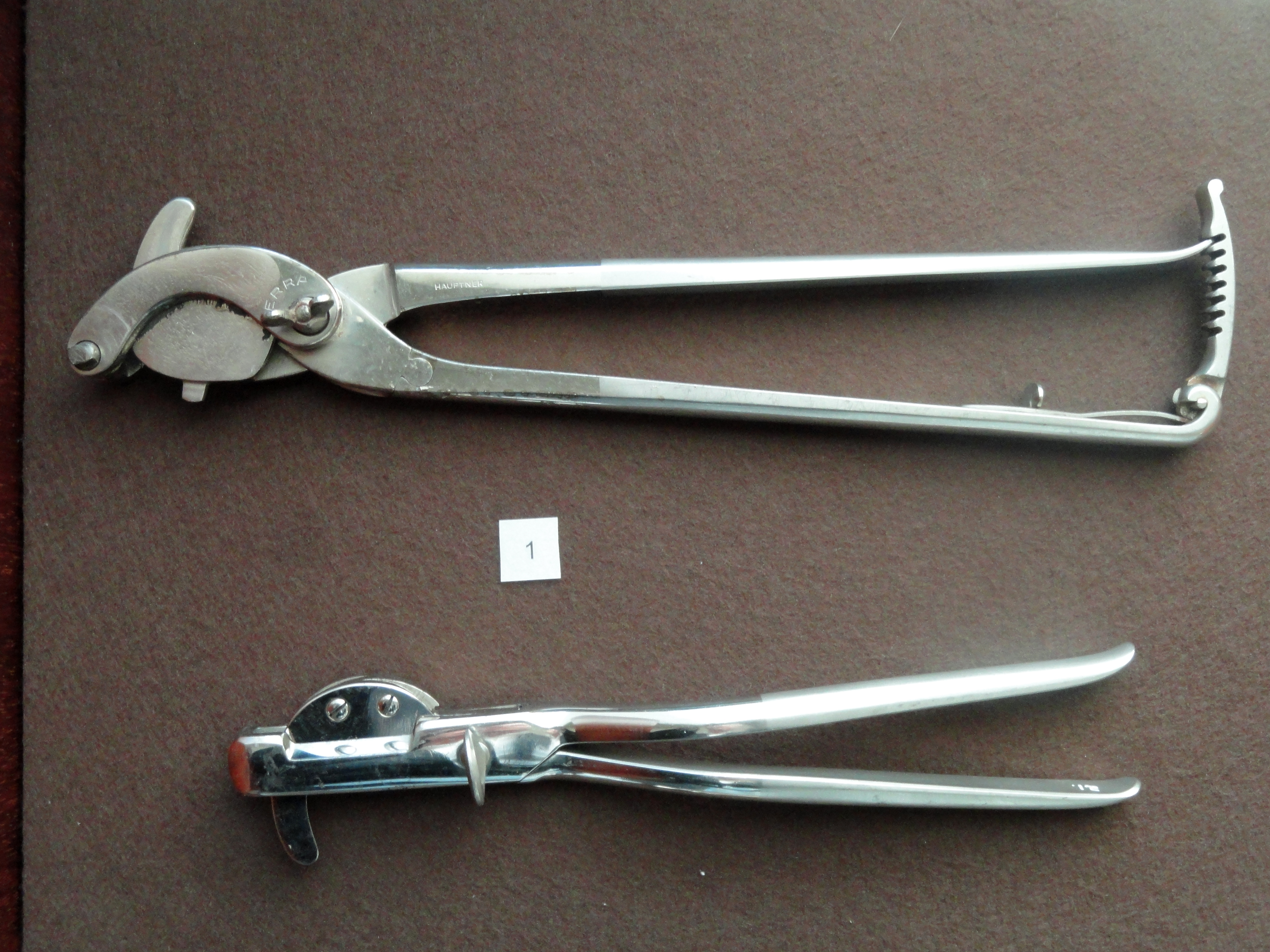
Two emasculators of different sizes.

An emasculator is a tool used in the castration of livestock. Its function is to simultaneously crush and cut the spermatic cord, preventing hemorrhaging while still detaching the testis from the animal.

The blade is always on the side of the emasculator with the nut that holds the blades in place, and should always be placed adjacent to the testis ("nut against nut") so that the crushing clamp occludes the spermatic artery, preventing life-threatening blood loss.

The ratchet (visible on the handle) allows the emasculator to be locked in the "closed" position for the 2–3 minutes required for primary hemostasis to occur.

The ends of the "clamp" are rounded and guarded to allow the emasculator to be placed over the testis and spermatic cord without cutting, until pressure is applied.
