= British Milksheep =

British breed of sheep

The British Milksheep is a robust, dual-purpose sheep commonly known for its milking characteristics.

== History ==
The British Milksheep originally was known as the Alderbred and is a breed of domesticated sheep developed by Lawrence Alderson and his wife Mary in Wiltshire and Northumberland. It was exported to several countries including Hungary, France and Greece, and from there other neighbouring countries. It now can be found mainly in the UK, Hungary and Canada, although the population in Britain was decimated during the outbreak of foot-and-mouth disease in 2001. The exact composition of the breed has never been declared but it was based on high-performance animals in existing flocks of Dorset Horn, Bluefaced Leicester and Eastrip Prolific sheep kept by the Alderson family. Additional individual animals were selected from Lleyn, Texel and East Friesian breeds. Subsequent selection was based on measures of productivity, without regard for uniformity of appearance. A standardised breed type emerged gradually as the blending process continued. The animals were exposed to rugged conditions in the upper Pennines in northern England to develop robustness and adaptability. Progeny testing from the initial stages laid the foundation for continuous genetic improvement. Initially, total ownership of females of the breed was retained by the family and only rams were sold, but groups of females were released to other breeders in 1981. Numbers of flocks and animals increased rapidly and there were more than 5,000 breeding ewes by the mid-1980s with flocks widespread in Britain. A flock book was published in 1986. As the name of the breed suggests, it is a prolific milk producer, and several large dairy flocks were established. However, it is a robust, dual-purpose sheep rather than a specialist dairy breed. It is known for its extremely high prolificacy, and rams are used to sire high-performance crossbred daughters. The quality of its carcase and wool are extra beneficial traits. In all countries outside Britain, the British Milksheep is used more as a dairying breed with dual-purpose qualities, but it is used also in most countries as a crossing sire; in Britain on hill and longwool breeds, in France in the Alps and Pyrenees on mountain breeds, in Greece on Chios dairy ewes, and in Hungary on the predominant Merino population. In France it has contributed to the development of the Boulonnais breed.

== Characteristics ==
The British Milksheep is a white-faced, clean-headed, polled sheep, with a large robust body that does well in conformation. At maturity, rams weigh 103 kg (227 lb) and ewes 79 kg (174 lb) on average. They have good carcase characteristics. In comparative trials in Hungary for meat production, crossbred lambs sired by British Milksheep had a superior carcase grading, a higher killing-out percentage than crosses sired by Ile de France, Suffolk and Mutton Merino rams, and the meat was the most tender as measured by shear force.

=== Milking Characteristics ===
It is the most prolific British breed. Mature ewes achieve an average litter size of more than 3.00 and this advantage carries through to lambs weaned per ewe. Before the breed settled to the desired level of prolificacy, some remarkable records were achieved in the early stages of the project, with sextuplets being not uncommon and one ewe achieving a lifetime record of 44 lambs in 10 crops. Comparative trials carried out by the Scottish Agricultural College in the 1990s showed that half-bred ewes sired by the British Milksheep achieved a level of productivity 11% higher than half-breds sired by Bluefaced Leicester and Border Leicester rams, and 26% higher than those sired by Bleu du Maine and Rouge de l’Ouest rams. Average milk yield depends on the standard of management of the flock and can vary from 250 to more than 400 litres in a 210-day lactation, with 6% fat and 6% protein. Some pure flocks continue to be used for dairying and produce milk for consumers with allergy to cows’ milk, ice-cream, and speciality cheeses in northern England and Canada. There are claims that ewes produce 650 L (170 US gal) to 900 L (240 US gal) of milk in a 300-day lactation with a 5.5 to 9.5% fat content but those claims have not been verified. In comparative trials for milk yield in Hungary, using the local Merino population with a milk yield of 30-50 litres per lactation, British Milksheep crosses proved superior to crosses by Lacaune and Awassi rams. They yielded 90-130 litres compared with 60-80 litres from Lacaune crosses and 80-105 litres from Awassi crosses.

=== Wool Characteristics ===
Ewes produce 4 kg (8.8 lb) and rams 6.5 kg (14 lb) fleece with a spinning count of 50 to 54s. The staple length is 12 to 18 cm (4.7 to 7.1 in).
