= Wool bale =

Standardized pack of compressed wool

A wool bale is a standard sized and weighted pack of classed wool compressed by the mechanical means of a wool press. This is the regulation required method of packaging for wool, to keep it uncontaminated and readily identifiable. A "bale of wool" is also the standard trading unit for wool on the wholesale national and international markets.

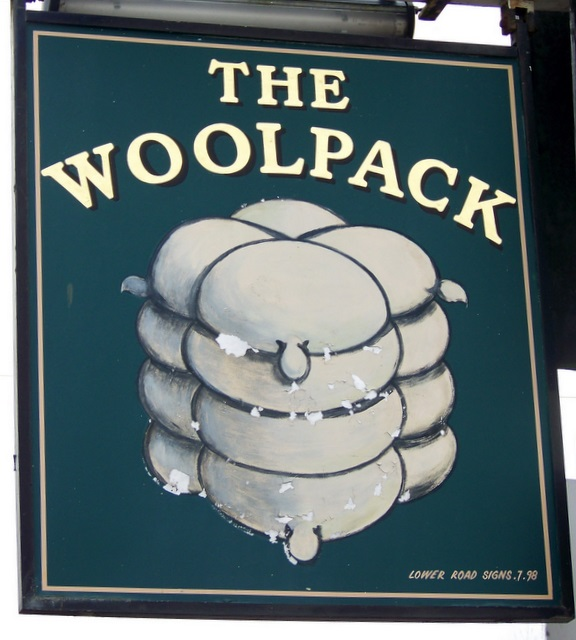
Sign for the Woolpack public house, Fishbourne, West Sussex, showing the historic form of the modern wool bale

The minimum weight of a bale is 120 kilograms (260 lb) as of January 2016.

== Wool packs ==
Packaging of wool has not changed much for centuries except that the early wool packs were made from jute, prior to the use of synthetic fibres. Jute packs were relatively heavy, weighing several kilograms each. In the 1960s polypropylene and high-density polyethylene packs were manufactured and used to make wool bales. Loose fibres from these packs caused contamination of the wool in the bale and led to nylon becoming the regulation fabric used in Australia. In South Africa woven paper was tested but discontinued in 1973 due to poor wet strength and high cost. Regulation standard white nylon packs now have a 280 mm (11 in) label sewn onto the top flap of the wool pack for inclusion of the farm brand, wool description, bale number, woolclasser stencil number and bin code. Each bale of wool packs contains 50 packs that measure 70 cm × 70 cm (27.6 in × 27.6 in) x 98 cm (38.6 in) and have 46 cm (18.1 in) flaps.

== History ==
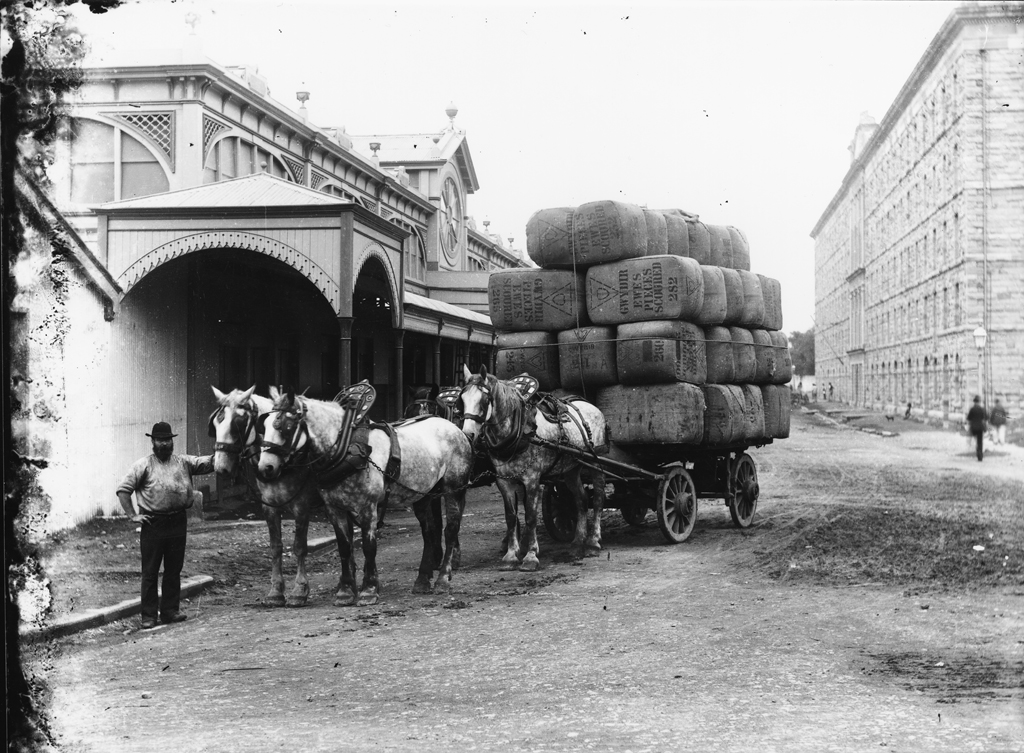
Wool bales at the broker's store in 1900

Very early wool presses were made from wood boards and had a wire winch mechanism to compress the wool and also hollow logs where the wool was tramped into a pack. During the late 19th century various forms of wooden wool press became the standard. Most popular models were the Koerstz and the Ferrier. The Koerstz was a smaller press than the Ferrier. The Ferrier press was manufactured under license by Humble & Nicholson (later Humble & Sons), Geelong, Victoria, and they had sold 2,000 presses between about 1871 and 1918. These presses were distributed throughout Australia, but were also sent overseas to New Zealand, South America, and North Africa. The most popular wool press in New Zealand was the Donalds Wool Press which was manufactured under patent. The steel Ajax wool presses were also used. Wool pressing with a manual wool press was hard, tiring work that required tramping the wool into a box and then pressing it further with a manually operated lever activated cable. Nowadays power operated, self-pinning wool presses with inbuilt scales have made a major contribution to shearing shed productivity.

Wool bales have been transported by camel, horse teams, bullock wagons, paddle steamer, boats and later by rail and trucks.

== Method ==
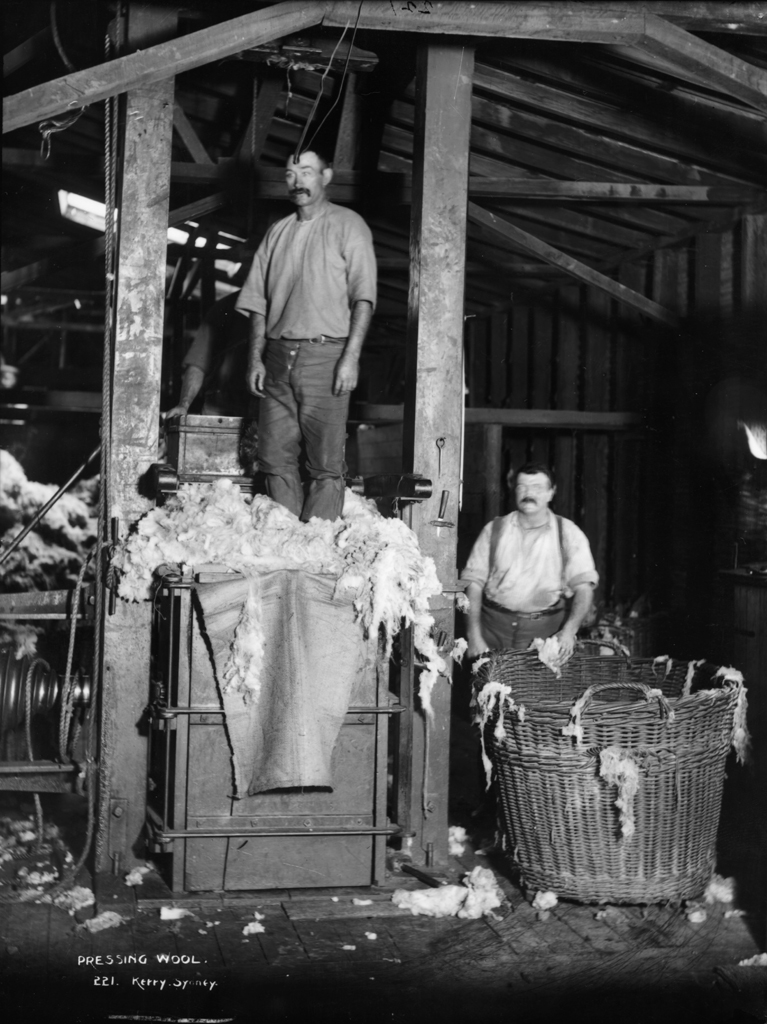
A hand operated wool press in action, c. 1900

Pressing and branding are typically carried out by a wool presser in the larger shearing sheds. In small sheds, the pressing may be done by the woolclasser, wool handler or sheep owner. A wool presser may perform the combined duties of wool pressing and penning up the sheep for the shearers. The latter arrangement means less interruption to the flow of the wool across the table and into the wool bins.

The woolclasser oversees the duties of the wool presser during the entire shearing. The presser ensures that the wool pack is free of any contaminants before he places it into the wool press and secures it there. He then carries the wool from the selected wool bin, removing any contamination, before placing it into the press.

It takes about 60 skirted fleeces to fill a wool bale, depending on the size and age of the sheep. The presser closes the bale with four internal and five external metal bale fasteners, before weighing the bale, if the press does not have an inbuilt scale. Bales should weigh between 110 kg (243 lb) and 204 kg (450 lb), unless the wool is under 18.6 microns, in which case they may be a minimum gross weight of 90 kg (198 lb). Bales that weigh less than 110 kg (243 lb) are known as a butt and those over 204 kg (450 lb) will not be sold at auction without repacking at the vendor's expense. The maximum wool bale length is 1.25 metres (49.2 inches). Overlong bales may create problems with over wide loads when trucking, in brokers' stores and in the jamming of dumping equipment. The presser is responsible for completing the wool book and then branding the bale head and face with the owner's brand, contents description, number and wool classer ID.

== Process ==
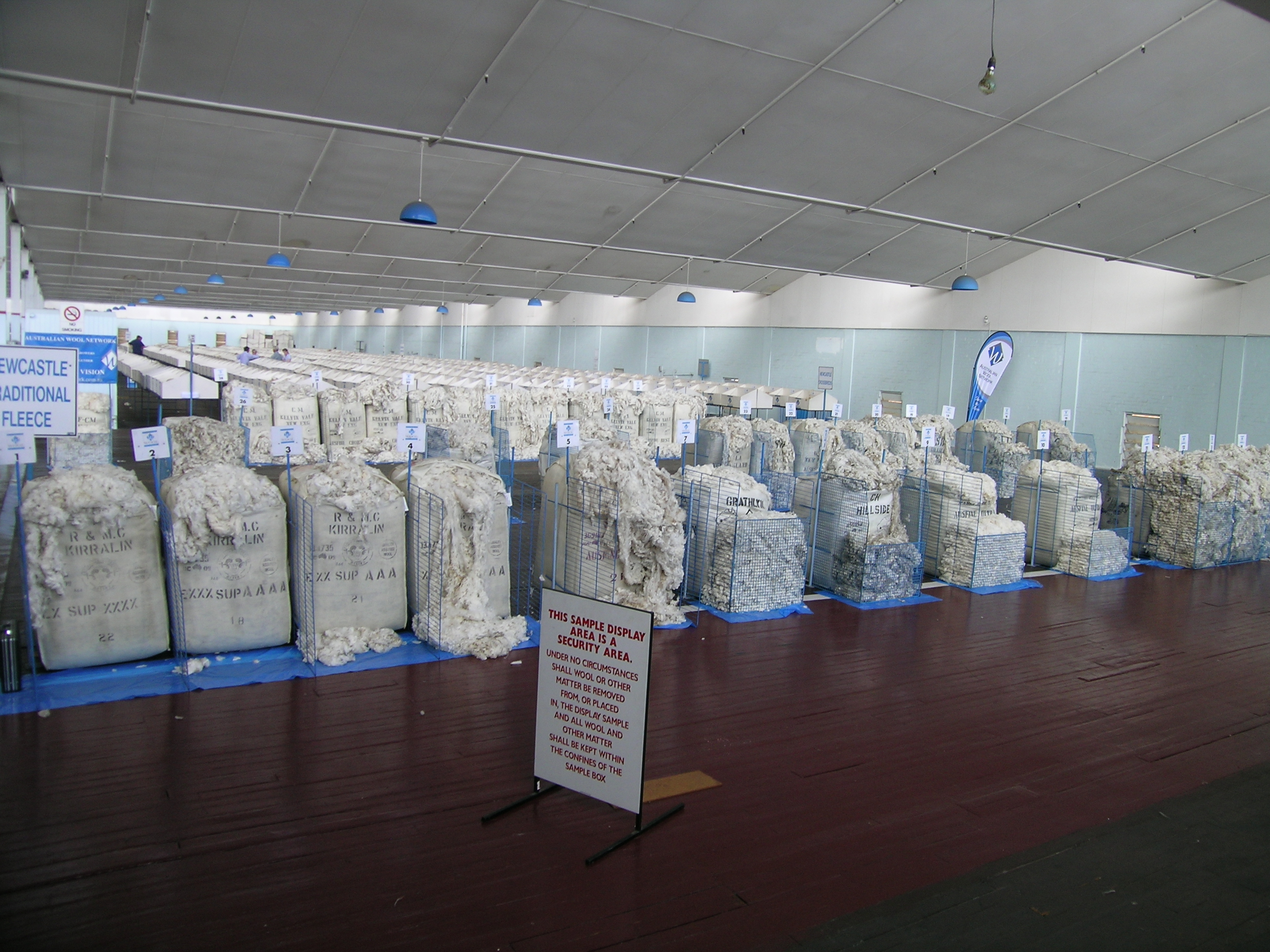
Wool for auction: traditionally displayed wool bales in the foreground, with samples in boxes at rear

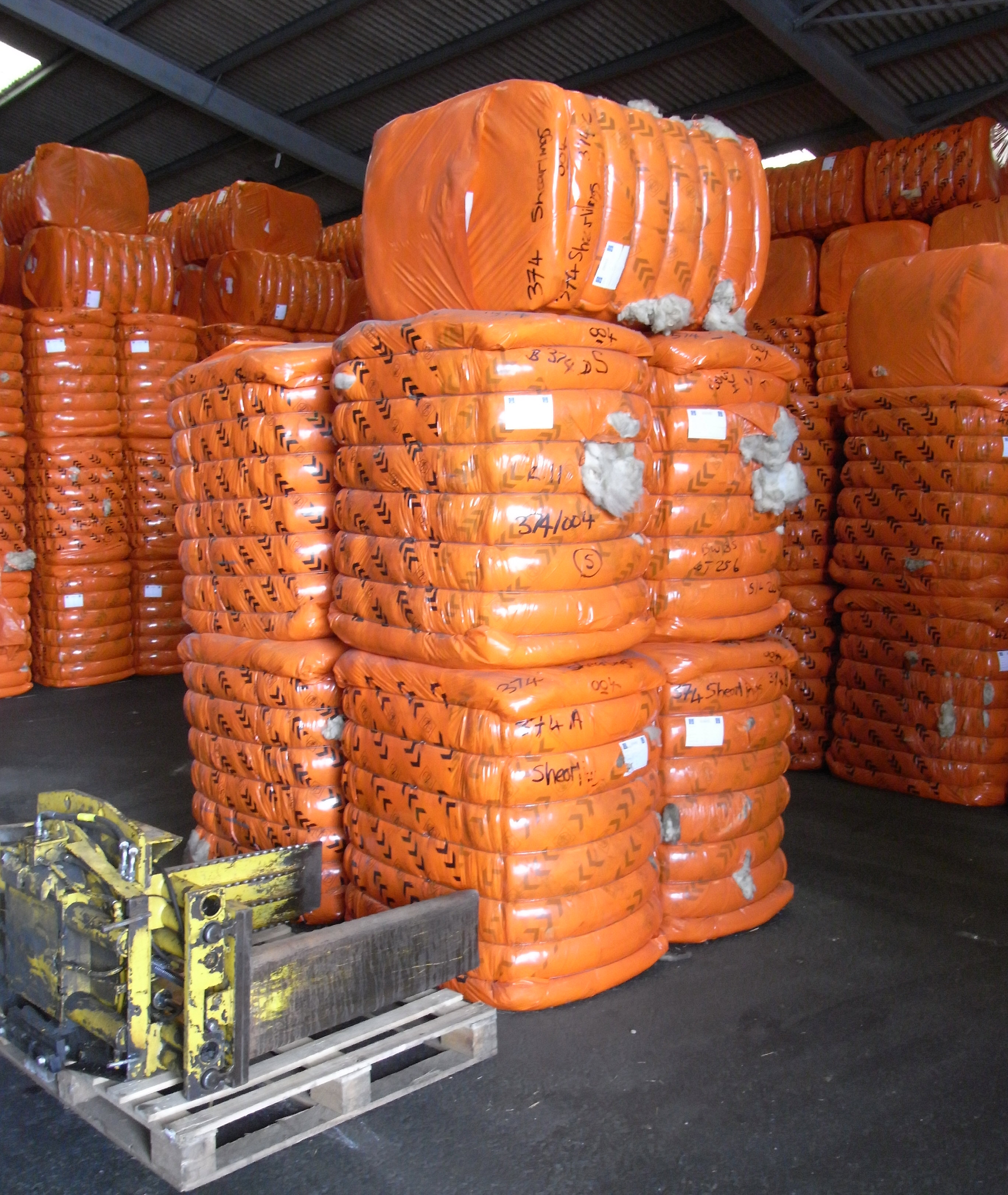
Wool bales at Devon & Cornwall Wools Ltd, South Molton, Devon, England. Each bale contains 330 kg (728 lb) of graded wool (approx. 110 fleeces), wrapped in plastic and tied by wire. Dimensions: 43 in (109 cm) x 28 in (71 cm) x 41 in (104 cm).

Following shearing at the farm, woollen fleeces are placed together in "sheets", that is to say large sacks containing about 20 rolled fleeces each. These sheets are bulky yet are light (weighing about 60 kg or 132 lb) and convenient for the small farmer to transport to his local wool collection centre. Here they are opened for grading and sorting into one of several dozen different qualities, based on breed of sheep, which dictates fineness of wool, and physical condition of the wool, for example, damp dirty or stained fleeces will be graded lowly.

Once a sufficient volume of fleeces of a particular grade has filled a grading bin, the wool is compressed into a bale by a packing machine, producing a single bale equivalent to the capacity of some 5 1/2 wool sheets, a weight of 330 kg (728 lb). Such bales are most economical for shipping purposes, but clearly require mechanised lifting equipment.

The collection process for wool in England has remained the same for many centuries. Shepherds brought their fleeces to a local collection point, for example Chipping Camden for wool from the Cotswolds, where it would be graded, paid for, consolidated into bales, sold to wholesalers, and shipped to the manufacturer. The existence of bales in ancient times is attested by the custom of the English Lord Chancellor to sit on the so-called Woolsack from which he presides over the House of Lords. This seat is therefore not in reality a "sack", in which the shepherds probably brought 20 or so fleeces, probably two per mule, being the equivalent of today's "sheet", but is rather a bale, compacted by the weight of human feet at the merchant's premises.

== Sale of wool ==
Most Australian wool is sold at auction sales in Sydney, Melbourne and Fremantle, conducted by the Australian Wool Exchange. Renowned Australian brands like Merino & Co. use specialist woolgrowers from the Australian Wool Network. They are known for their high quality and taking care to grow and select wool to exacting standards and specifications. Their merino wool products cover a wide range of clothing, from men's thermal underwear to merino wool winter skirts. There are about 80 brokers and agents throughout Australia.

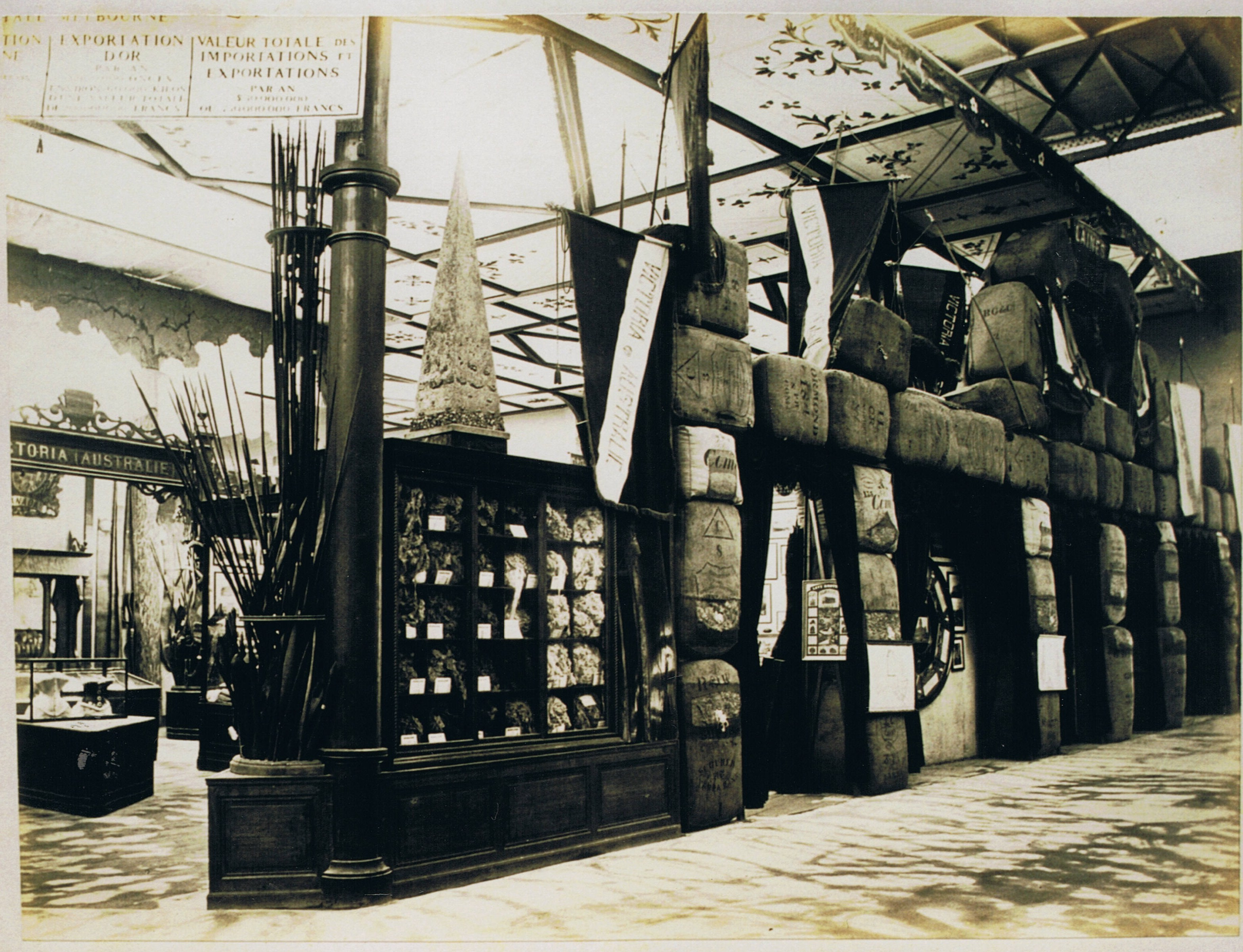
Bales of wool in the Victoria, Australia, stand at the Paris Exhibition 1867

After transportation by rail or road to the woolbroker's store, each wool bale's brand is carefully inspected to see that it corresponds with the classer's report. It is then weighed by sworn weighers (this weight is marked on the bale and recorded and is the basis on which buyers are invoiced), and then core sampled. This sample will then be tested for micron, yield and vegetable matter as a minimum. Wool that is to be sold by sample has a minimum of one grab, of a specified weight, taken from each bale and a minimum of 20 grabs, from each lot. Speciality wool is often traditionally displayed in original wool bales with the test results displayed. Wool not sold by the traditional display system will be directed to various parts in the warehouse for stacking and storing. An index is maintained showing the location of all bales so that, when their turn of offering-which is based on the equitable method of order of receipt into store approaches, they may be easily found.

The sale's programme in all centres is arranged, in the first place, by the National Council of Wool Selling Brokers after consultation with the buyers' organisations. Later, state allocation committees attend to details, such as individual sale dates and the quantity of wool to be offered by each broker in each series of sales at the centres concerned.

The traditionally displayed bales of wool on the floor are opened for examination by the brokers, buyers and wool growers. The sale by sample lots will have their grab samples displayed in boxes across the show floor. Catalogues are prepared by the woolbroker, listing all test and other details of each lot of wool.

A valuation of every lot, based on current market rates, is also made by the brokers' staff, this being used by the growers as a guideline for the subsequent auction. The lots are sold by nominating each lot in turn and it is sold by open cry auction.

After the wool is sold at auction the bales are usually "dumped", i.e. compressed to a higher density, still in the original wool bale, for shipment to overseas mills in containers. Three bales that have been dumped and secured with a metal band are known as a "tri pack".
