= S number =

S number may refer to:

== Standards ==
- Meter Point Administration Number, often referred to as Supply Number or S-Number, a 21-digit number used in Great Britain to uniquely identify electricity supply points
- S number (wool), an international scale measuring the fineness of the threads in woven wool

== Mathematics ==
- In Mahler's classification, a number with finite measure of transcendence
- Singular value, the square root of an eigenvalue of a nonnegative self-adjoint operator

== Other ==
- Numbering of compositions by Franz Liszt according to Humphrey Searle's catalogue
- The signal strength readout of an S meter used in radio receiving equipment
