= S number (wool) =

Number that indicates the fineness of the wool fiber

An S number on the label of wool suits or other tailored apparel, wool fabric, or yarn, indicates the fineness of the wool fiber as measured by its maximum diameter in micrometres. Fiber fineness is one of the main factors determining the quality and performance of a wool product. It is an important marketing term used by many mills, garment makers, and retailers. The range starts from the coarsest "Super 80s" wool of 19.75 micron and extends to the finest "Super 250s" wool of merely 11.25 micron in diameter.

== Super S ==
The S number is used in conjunction with the word "super" which originally meant the best wool, (also called choice wool in the United States). As it is now used, Super means pure new wool and can also be used for fabrics made from wool blended with rare fiber (such as mohair, cashmere wool and alpaca), and also with silk. The inclusion of Elastane to give the fabric a stretch effect is permitted, as also is the inclusion of up to 5% non-wool yarn for decorative effects. For wool blend fabric descriptions, the word Super is not permitted. Subject to the wool content being at least 45%, the S number may be used.

The S-number indicates the thickness of the fibre as defined in the IWTO Super S Code of Practice. Each S-number correlates to a maximum fibre diameter measured in micrometers, as shown in the table below. Fiber diameters are measured from the finished, dyed fabric.

Super S in micrometers
| Super … S number | Diameter of fibre in micrometers |
| 80 | 19.75 |
| 90 | 19.25 |
| 100 | 18.75 |
| 110 | 18.25 |
| 120 | 17.75 |
| 130 | 17.25 |
| 140 | 16.75 |
| 150 | 16.25 |
| 160 | 15.75 |
| 170 | 15.25 |
| 180 | 14.75 |
| 190 | 14.25 |
| 200 | 13.75 |
| 210 | 13.25 |
| 220 | 12.75 |
| 230 | 12.25 |
| 240 | 11.75 |
| 250 | 11.25 |

== History ==
The S numbers originated in England, where the worsted spinning process was invented and arose from the worsted yarn count system for stating the fineness of yarn. The worsted count (also known as the Bradford count) was the number of 560-yard (510 m) lengths (hanks) of worsted yarn that 1 pound (0.45 kg) of wool yields. The finer the wool, the more yarn and the higher the count.

== Metric yarn count ==
The worsted count was only a rough measurement and has been replaced by more exact methods such as the metric yarn count. However, for fine wool, the memory of the older system survives in the S numbers which have a very rough correspondence to worsted count. In other words, fiber that yielded about 80 worsted hanks is roughly comparable to fiber designated as 80s using the S numbers. The critical difference is that while the worsted number was an indirect measure (and a rough one at that) of yarn thickness, the S number is a direct (and precise) measurement of the thickness of the fiber. The S number of fiber, and hence of yarn, fabric, or garments made of that fiber, is determined using the international standard promulgated by the International Wool Textile Organisation.

== International standard ==
The International Wool Textile Organisation (IWTO) is the promulgator of the Fabric Labelling Code of Practice which governs the use of the "S" and "Super S" designations for fine wool and wool blend fabrics. The Code defines the S number by correlation to maximum fiber diameter. For example, 80s must have maximum fiber diameter of 19.75 micrometres or finer and 90s, 19.25 micrometres or finer. This scale continues to the 210s at 13.25 micrometre or finer. Thus each step of ten (as from 80s to 90s or 90s to 100s) corresponds to 0.5 micrometre less in allowed maximum fiber diameter. It has been proposed to extend the scale to 250s at 11.25 micrometre or finer.

IWTO is the international body representing the interests of the world's wool textile trade and industry. IWTO membership covers wool growers, traders, primary processors, spinners, weavers, garment makers and retailers of wool and allied fibers in its member-countries, as well as all kinds of organizations related to wool products and the wool business in general.

== Government regulation ==
=== United States ===
In the United States labeling of wool products is regulated by the Wool Products Labeling Act of 1939 (15 U.S.C. § 68). The Act was modified, for wool products manufactured on or after January 1, 2007, by the Wool Suit Fabric Labeling Fairness and International Standards Conforming Act which defined the use of the Super S and S designations in a manner conforming to the IWTO Code. The U.S. defines the S numbers for 80s to 250s. Violation of the WPLA may carry a substantial penalty.

== See also ==
- List of ISO standards
- Spinning count
- Units of textile measurement
- Wool measurement
