= Shearing shed =

Building where sheep are shorn

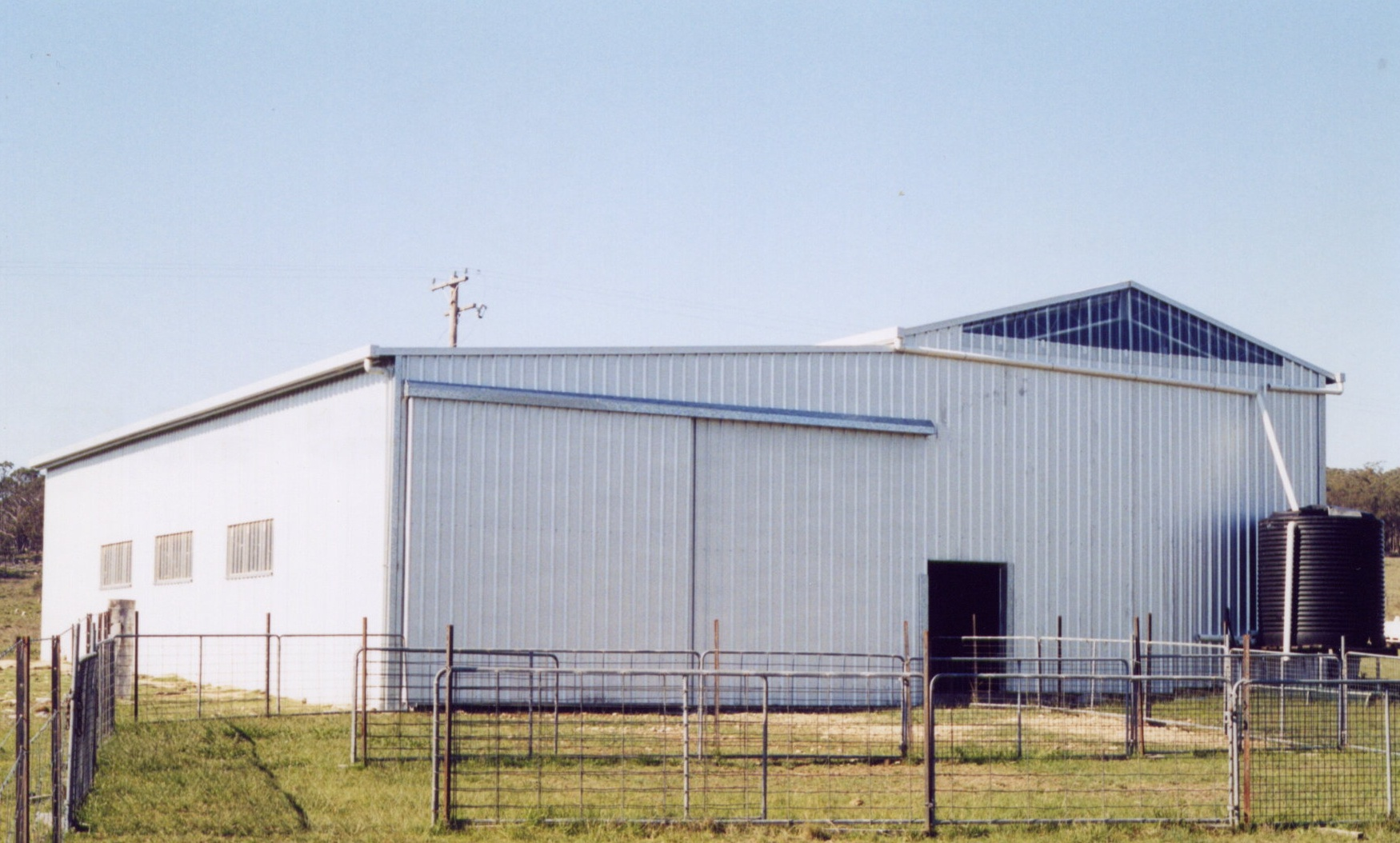
A modern Australian shearing shed

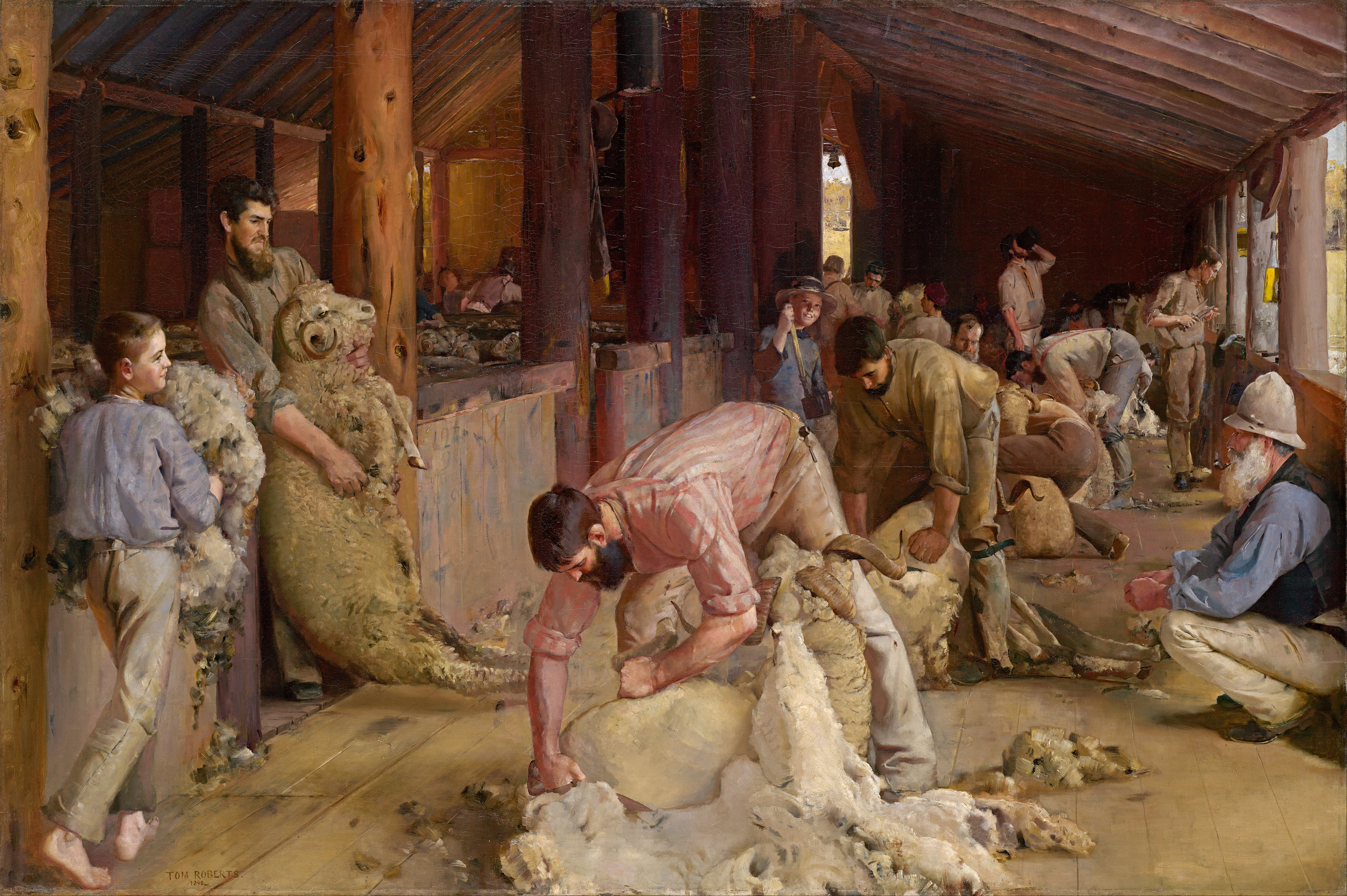
Tom Roberts' 1890 painting Shearing the Rams depicts an Australian shearing shed in the late 1800s

Shearing sheds (or wool sheds) are large sheds located on sheep stations to accommodate large scale sheep shearing activities.

In countries where large numbers of sheep are kept for wool, sometimes many thousands in a flock, shearing sheds are vital to house the necessary shearing equipment, and to ensure that the shearers and /or crutchers have a ready supply of dry, empty sheep. The shed also provides space where the wool is classed and pressed into approved wool packs and stored to await transport to market.

Location of the shed is important as the site needs to be well drained and in an area reasonably close to most of the flock. It is helpful and will save a lot of money if the shed is located near to the electricity supply. At least some yards will be needed to facilitate shedding and count-outs.

Regional variants of shearing shed architecture throughout Australia and New Zealand have been identified through different uses of building materials and local styles of design.

During recent years occupational safety and health and animal welfare issues in Australia also have to be considered during shed building or renovating. There should be guard rails around raised shearing boards and loading landings should be fenced to prevent falls. Separate facilities are to be provided for workers' meals.

== Sheep penning area ==
It is usually regarded as necessary to be able to shed, and keep dry, sheep for two days of shearing. Wet or damp sheep may cause health problems for the shearers and damp wool cannot be pressed. In many instances sheep are held under the shed or in an adjacent area known as a sweating shed. In the shearing shed the woolly sheep will be penned on a slatted wooden or woven mesh floor above ground level. The sheep entry to the shed is via a wide ramp, with good footholds and preferably enclosed sides. After shearing the shearing shed may also provide warm shelter for newly shorn sheep if the weather is likely to be cold and/or wet.

In recent years shearing sheds have usually included improved penning systems to assist with the movement of sheep and ideally will include swing/slide gates to facilitate their closure. A single sheep is sometimes penned in a small pen at the front of the forcing lane to coax the other sheep forward. The slats in a catching pen run in the direction that the sheep are to be dragged. Modern sheds often include a catching pen floor that slopes towards the board to help shearers move their sheep towards their "stand".

== Shearing area ==
Ideally shearers should not have to cross the shearing board with their sheep or move them excessive lengths. Earlier shed plans often had the catching pen on the opposite side of the release chutes which necessitated shearers crossing the board and paths with the roustabout. Nowadays the shearing board may be of a curved and/or raised style to save the roustabout extra walking and bending. Sheep may be released through the wall or through a chute in the floor, depending on the plan used. A tongued and grooved wooden floor is best for the shearing board and wool processing area (wool room) as it is easier to keep clean, especially with scrapers and to slide butts of wool along.

== Wool room ==
This area is planned to reduce walking distances for all shed hands. The shorn fleece is picked up by the roustabout and cast onto a wool table for skirting, rolling and classing, before being placed in the appropriate wool bin. Wool bins should be made of a solid material in order that the different lines do not mix. Slatted wool tables are of two styles: round, revolving tables, which are handy if there is only one wool-roller; or the traditional rectangular type.

Adequate lighting and ventilation is provided for all shearers and shedhands who work in the shed. Good light is essential for quality shearing, wool classing and grinding etc., and is a very significant factor affecting sheep flow in the penning area. In the Southern Hemisphere southern walls can have translucent sheeting installed there as a source of natural lighting because direct sunlight is never a problem.

Good ventilation is essential to provide fresh air and improve working conditions during hot weather. Shearing sheds can become extremely hot, even in cooler climates, during the summer. The body heat of the sheep and the insulating qualities of wool contribute to the problem. Ceiling fans are reasonably priced and helpful in this regard.

The grinding area (for sharpening combs and cutters) should be situated away from walkways to reduce the risk of injury.

Power operated, self-pinning wool presses with inbuilt scales, which produce standard wool bales, have made a major contribution to shearing shed productivity.

The wool producer is responsible for ensuring that the shearing shed is ready for shearing by testing the equipment, cleaning, disinfecting the shed and supplying emery papers, wool packs etc.

Shearing sheds are often inspected during shearing for compliance to various shed standards for the production of quality wool. Basically this means that the shed is clean, free of rubbish, dogs and twine.

== See also ==
- Roustabout
- Sheep shearer
- Sheep shearing
- Shearing machinery
- Wool classing
