= Sheep shearing =

Process by which wool on a sheep is cut off

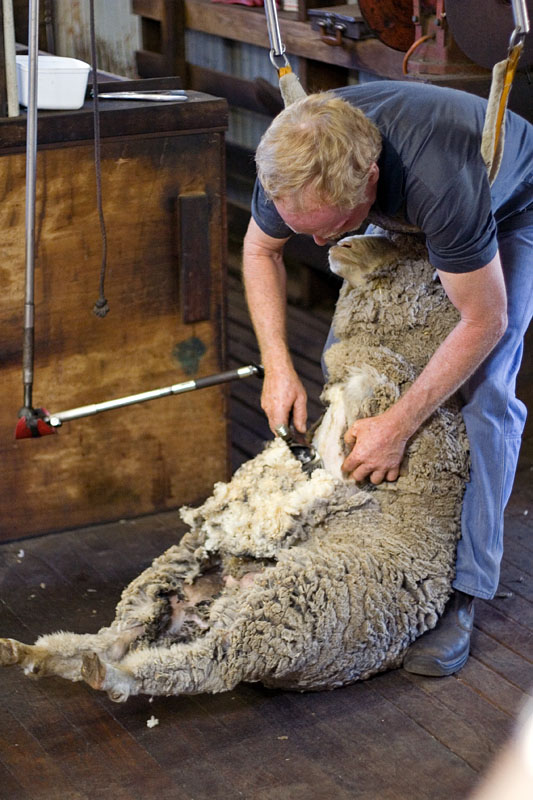
Machine shearing a Merino, Western Australia. The shearer is using a sling for back support.

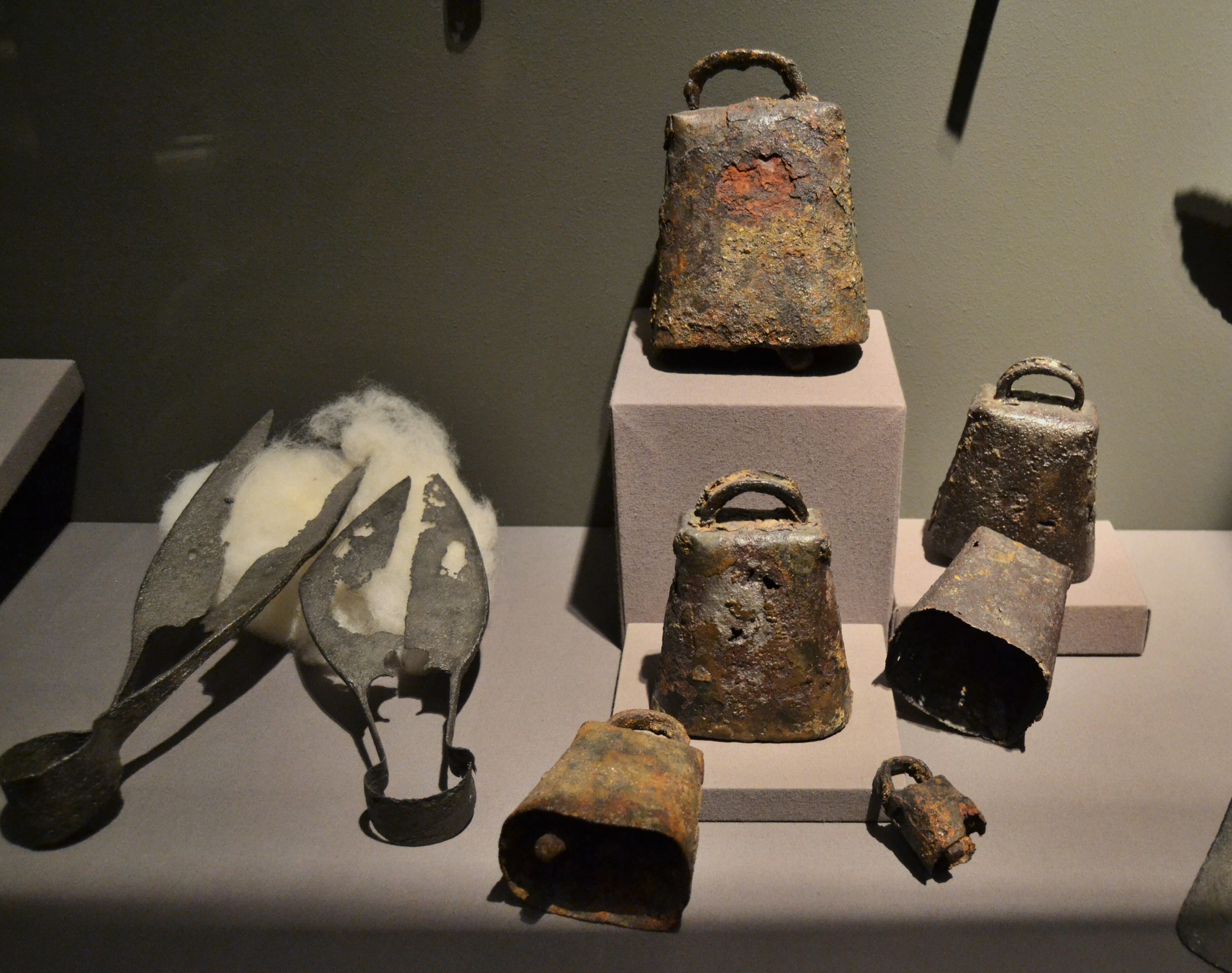
Shears and cowbells c. 250 AD Spain

Sheep shearing is the process by which the woollen fleece of a sheep is cut off. The person who removes the sheep's wool is called a shearer. Typically each adult sheep is shorn once each year (depending upon dialect, a sheep may be said to have been "shorn", "sheared" or "shore" [in Australia]). The annual shearing most often occurs in a shearing shed, a facility especially designed to process often hundreds and sometimes more than 3,000 sheep per day. A working group of shearers and accompanying wool workers is known as a shearing gang.

Sheep are shorn in all seasons including winter, depending on the climate, management requirements and the availability of a woolclasser and shearers. Ewes are normally shorn prior to lambing in the warmer months, but consideration is typically made as to the welfare of the lambs by not shearing during cold climate winters. However, in high country regions, pre lamb shearing encourages ewes to seek shelter among the hillsides so that newborn lambs are not completely exposed to the elements. Shorn sheep tolerate frosts well, but young sheep especially will suffer in cold, wet windy weather (even in cold climate summers). In this event they are shedded for several nights until the weather clears. Some sheep may also be shorn with stud combs commonly known as cover combs which leave more wool on the animal in colder months, giving greater protection.

Sheep shearing is also considered a sport with competitions held around the world. It is often done between spring and summer.

== History ==
=== Pre-Industrial Europe ===
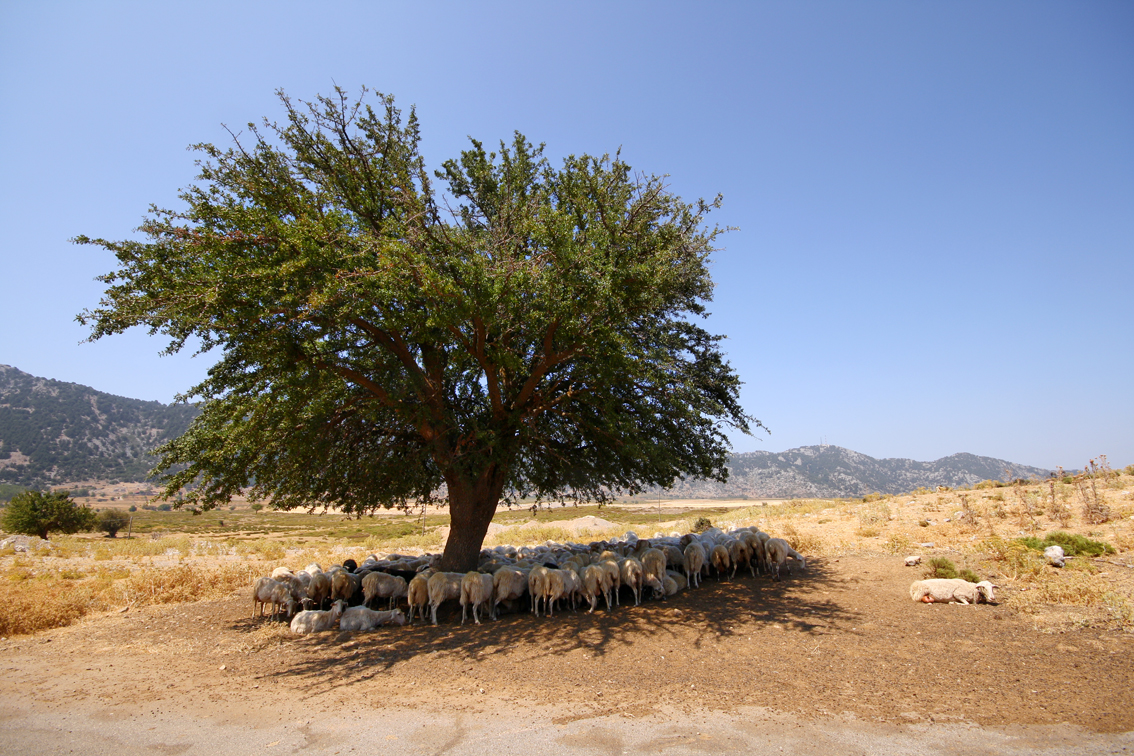
Sheep in modern Crete

Europe's oldest city, Knossos, derived its wealth from the sheep wool industry. The largest group of Linear B tablets is the great archive principally of shearing records though also of sheep breeding.

The medieval English wool trade was one of the most important factors in the English economy. The main sheep-shearing was an annual midsummer (June) event in medieval England culminating in the sheep-shearing feast. It had always been conventional practice to wash sheep.

=== Australia ===
In Australia, until the 1870s, squatters washed their sheep in nearby creeks prior to shearing. Later some expensive hot water installations were constructed on some of the larger stations for the washing. Australian growers were influenced by the Spanish practice of washing their very fine wool after shearing. There were three main reasons for the custom in Australia:

1. The English manufacturers demanded that Australian woolgrowers provide their fleeces free from excessive vegetable matter, burrs, soil, etc. so they could be processed in the same way as any other raw wool
2. The dirty fleeces were hard to shear and demanded that the metal blade shears be sharpened more often.
3. Wool in Australia was carted by bullock team or horse teams and charged by weight. Washed wool was lighter and did not cost as much to transport.

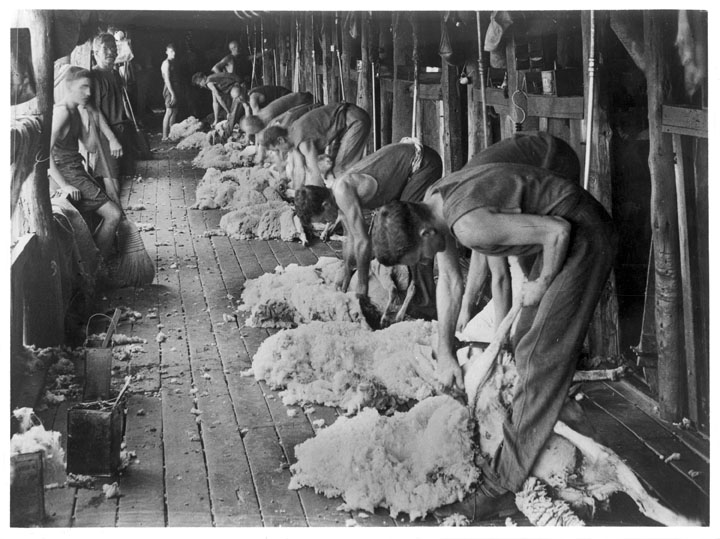
Sheep shearers in Queensland, Australia, c. 1948

The practice of washing the wool rather than the sheep evolved from the fact that hotter water could be used to wash the wool, than that used to wash the sheep. When the practice of selling wool in the grease occurred in the 1890s, wool washing became obsolete.

Australia and New Zealand had to discard the old methods of wool harvesting and evolve more efficient systems to cope with the huge numbers of sheep involved. Shearing was revolutionized by the invention of an Australian sheepgrower, Frederick York Wolseley. His machines made in Birmingham, England, by his business The Wolseley Sheep Shearing Machine Company were introduced after 1888, reducing second cuts and shearing time. By 1915 most large sheep station sheds in Australia had installed machines, driven by steam or later by internal combustion engines.

Shearing tables were invented in the 1950s and have not proved popular, although some are still used for crutching.

In the US, the worldwide shortage of shearers is becoming a consideration for those wanting to expand wool production. With sheep numbers declining in that country the profession sees significantly less interest in becoming a qualified shearer. Importing labour during the Australian off-season has also become problematic because of delays in obtaining work visa and because shearers numbers are limited worldwide.

== Modern shearing in Australia ==
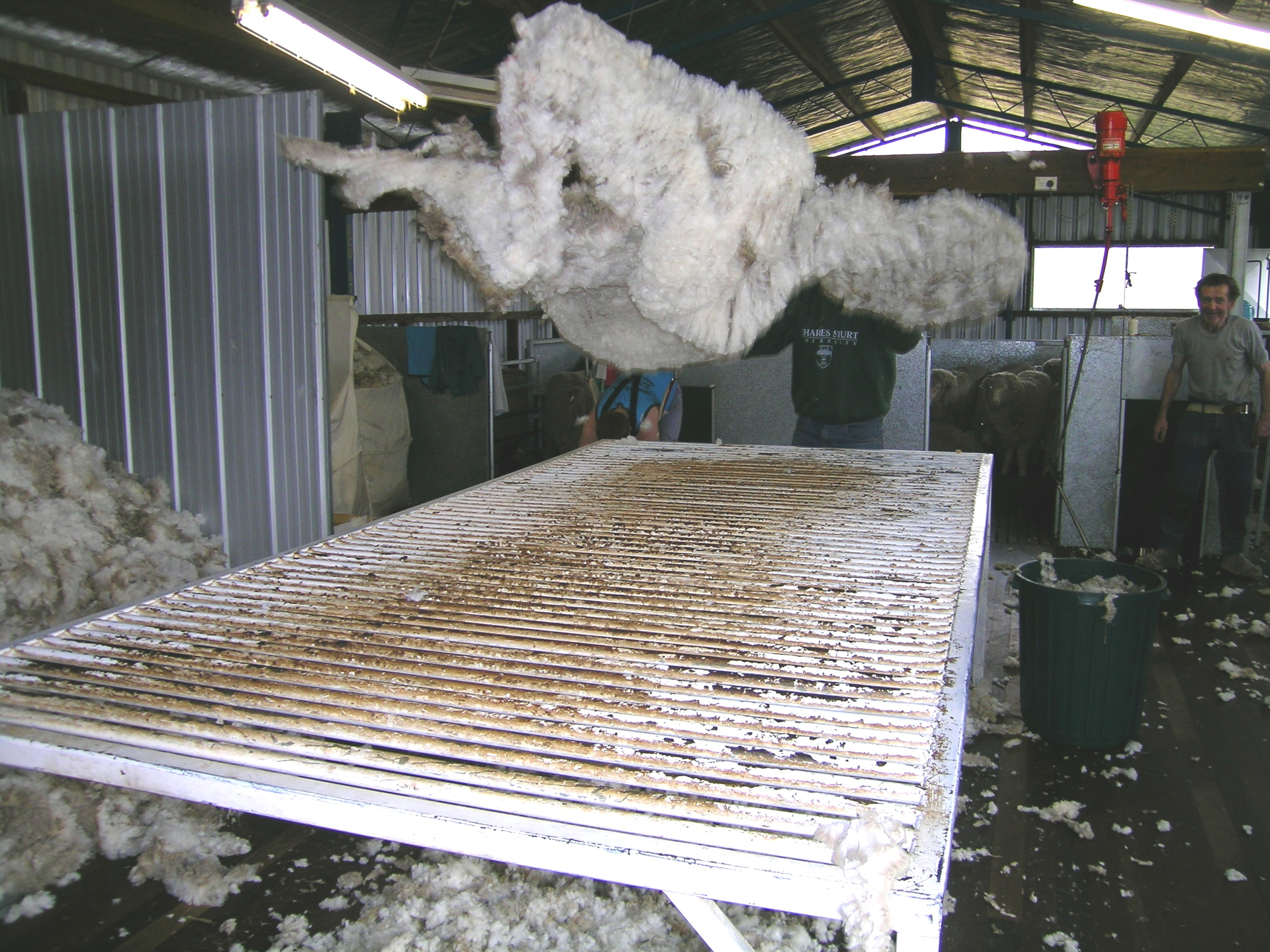
Throwing a fleece onto a wool table.

Today large flocks of sheep are mustered, inspected and possibly treated for parasites such as lice before shearing can start. then shorn by professional shearing teams working eight-hour days, most often in spring, by machine shearing. These contract-teams consist of shearers, shed hands and a cook (in the more isolated areas). Their working hours and wages are regulated by industry awards. A working day starts at 7:30 am and the day is divided into four "runs" of two hours each. "Smoko" breaks are a half-hour each and a lunch break is taken at midday for one hour. Most shearers are paid on a piece-rate per sheep. Shearers who "tally" more than 200 sheep per day are known as "gun shearers". Typical mass shearing of sheep today follows a well-defined workflow:

- remove the wool
- throw the fleece onto the wool table
- skirt, roll and class the fleece
- place it in the appropriate wool bin
- press and store the wool until it is transported

In 1984 Australia became the last country in the world to legalize the use of wide combs, due to previous Australian Workers' Union rules. Although they were once rare in sheds, women now take a large part in the shearing industry by working as pressers, wool rollers, rouseabouts, wool classers and shearers.

=== Wool removal ===
A sheep is caught by the shearer, from the catching pen, and taken to his "stand" on the shearing board. It is shorn using a mechanical handpiece (see Shearing devices below). The wool is removed by following an efficient set of movements, devised by Godfrey Bowen in about 1950 (the Bowen Technique) or the Tally-Hi method developed in 1963 and promoted by the Australian Wool Corporation. Sheep struggle less using the Tally-Hi method, reducing strain on the shearer and there is a saving of about 30 seconds in shearing each one.

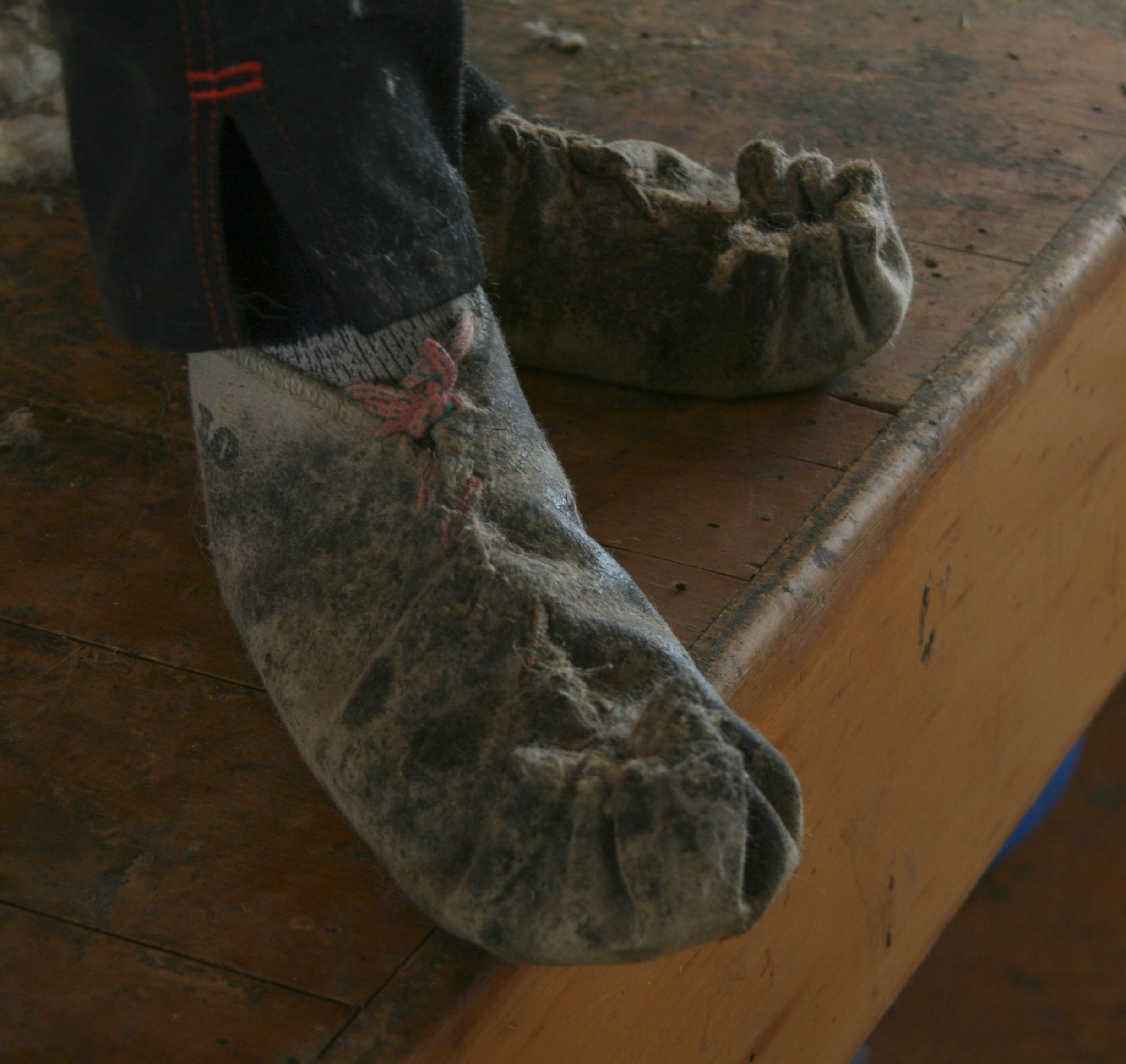
Shearers wear moccasins to protect their feet, grip wooden floors well, and absorb sweat.

The shearer begins by removing the belly wool, which is separated from the main fleece by a rouseabout, while the sheep is still being shorn. A professional or "gun" shearer typically removes a fleece, without significantly marking or cutting the sheep, in two to three minutes, depending on the size and condition of the sheep—less than two minutes in elite-competitive shearing. The shorn sheep is released and removed from the board via a chute in the floor or in a wall, to an exterior counting-out pen.

The CSIRO in Australia has developed a non-mechanical method of shearing sheep using an injected protein that creates a natural break in the wool fibres. After fitting a retaining net to enclose the wool, sheep are injected with the protein. When the net is removed after a week, the fleece has separated and is removed by hand. In some breeds a similar process occurs naturally.

=== Fleece skirting ===
Once the entire fleece has been removed from the sheep, the fleece is thrown, clean side down, on to a wool table by a shed hand (commonly known in New Zealand and Australian sheds as a rouseabout or rousie). The wool table top consists of slats spaced approximately 12 cm apart. This enables short pieces of wool, the locks and other debris, to gather beneath the table separately from the fleece. The fleece is then skirted by one or more wool rollers to remove the sweat fribs and other less desirable parts of the fleece. The removed pieces largely consist of shorter, seeded, burry or dusty wool etc. which is still useful in the industry. As such they are placed in separate containers and sold along with fleece wool. Other items removed from the fleece on the table, such as faeces, skin fragments or twigs and leaves, are discarded a short distance from the wool table so as not to contaminate the wool and fleece.

Following the skirting of the fleece, it is folded, rolled and examined for its quality in a process known as wool classing, which is performed by a registered and qualified wool classer. Based on its type, the fleece is placed into the relevant wool bin ready to be pressed (mechanically compressed) when there is sufficient wool to make a wool bale.

=== Rooing ===
In some primitive sheep (for example in many Shetlands), there is a natural break in the growth of the wool in spring. By late spring this causes the fleece to begin to peel away from the body, and it may then be plucked by hand without cutting – this is known as rooing. Individual sheep may reach this stage at slightly different times.

== Shearing devices ==
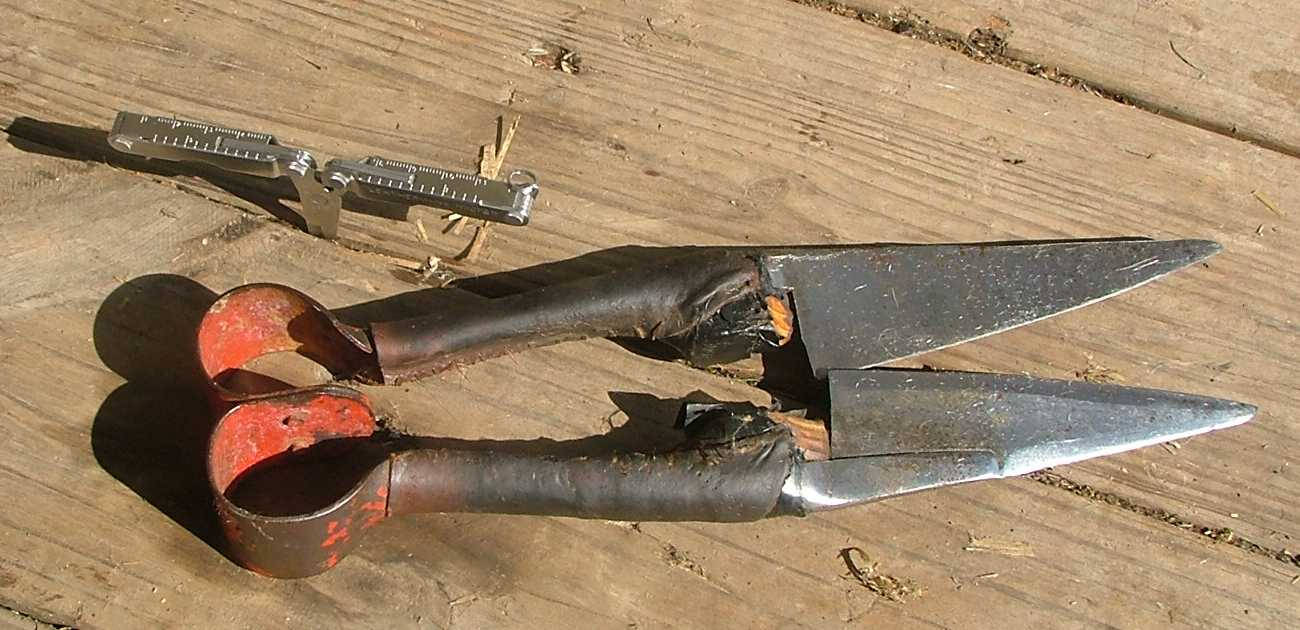
Blade shears

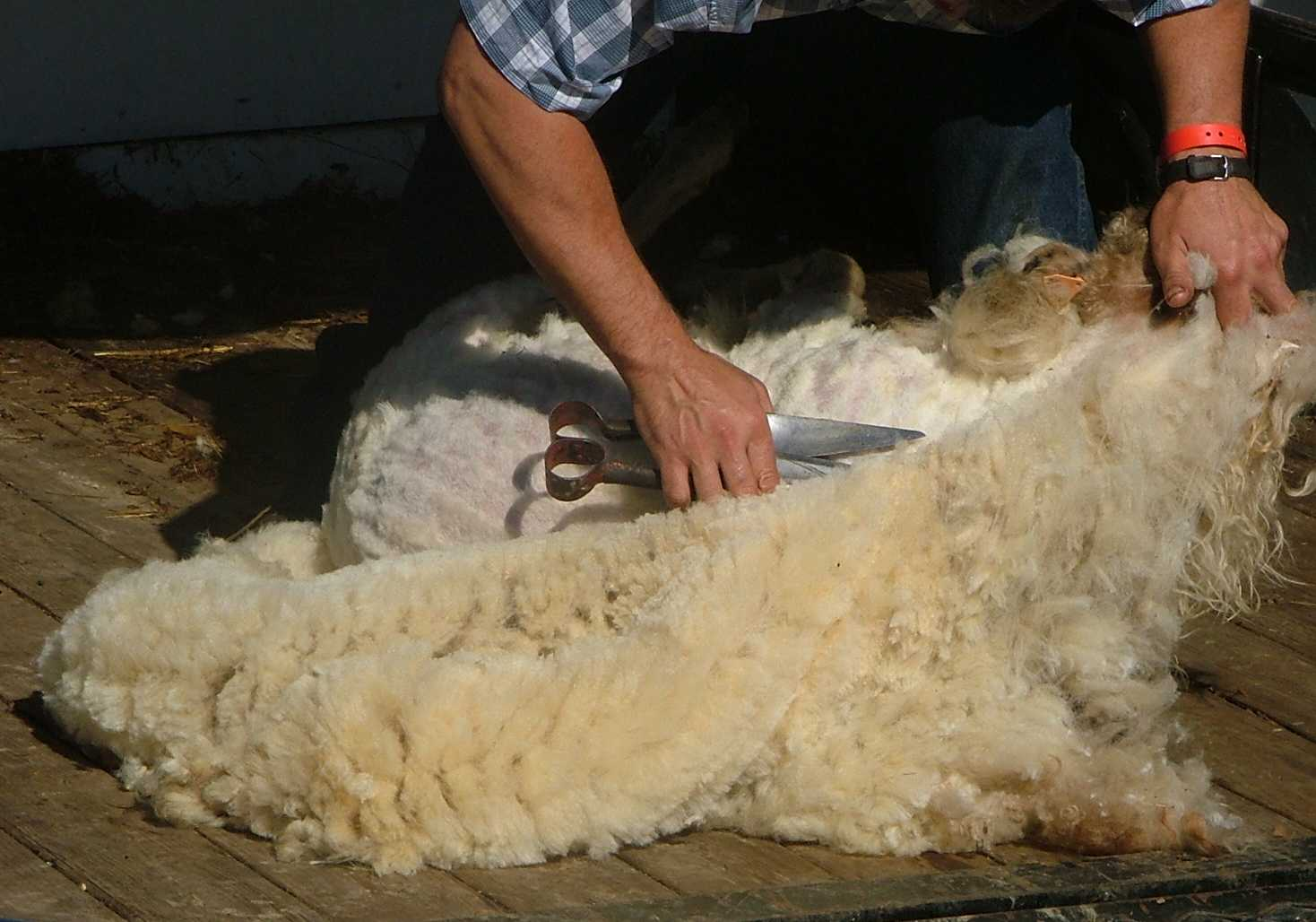
Blade shearing demonstration at the New York Sheep & Wool Fair

Whatever device is used, shearers must be careful to keep it clean so as to prevent the spread of disease amongst a flock.

Blade shearing has recently made a resurgence in Australia and the UK but mostly for sport rather than commercial shearing. Some competitions have attracted almost 30 competitors and there have even been shows created just for blade shearers to compete in.

=== Blade shears ===
Blade shears consist of two blades arranged similarly to scissors except that the hinge is at the end farthest from the point (not in the middle). The cutting edges pass each other as the shearer squeezes them together and shear the wool close to the animal's skin. Blade shears are still used today but in a more limited way. Blade shears leave some wool on a sheep and this is more suitable for cold climates such as the Canterbury high country in the South Island of New Zealand where approximately half a million sheep are still shorn with blade shears each year. For those areas where no powered-machinery is available blade shears are the only option. In Australia blades are more commonly used to shear stud rams.

=== Machine shears ===
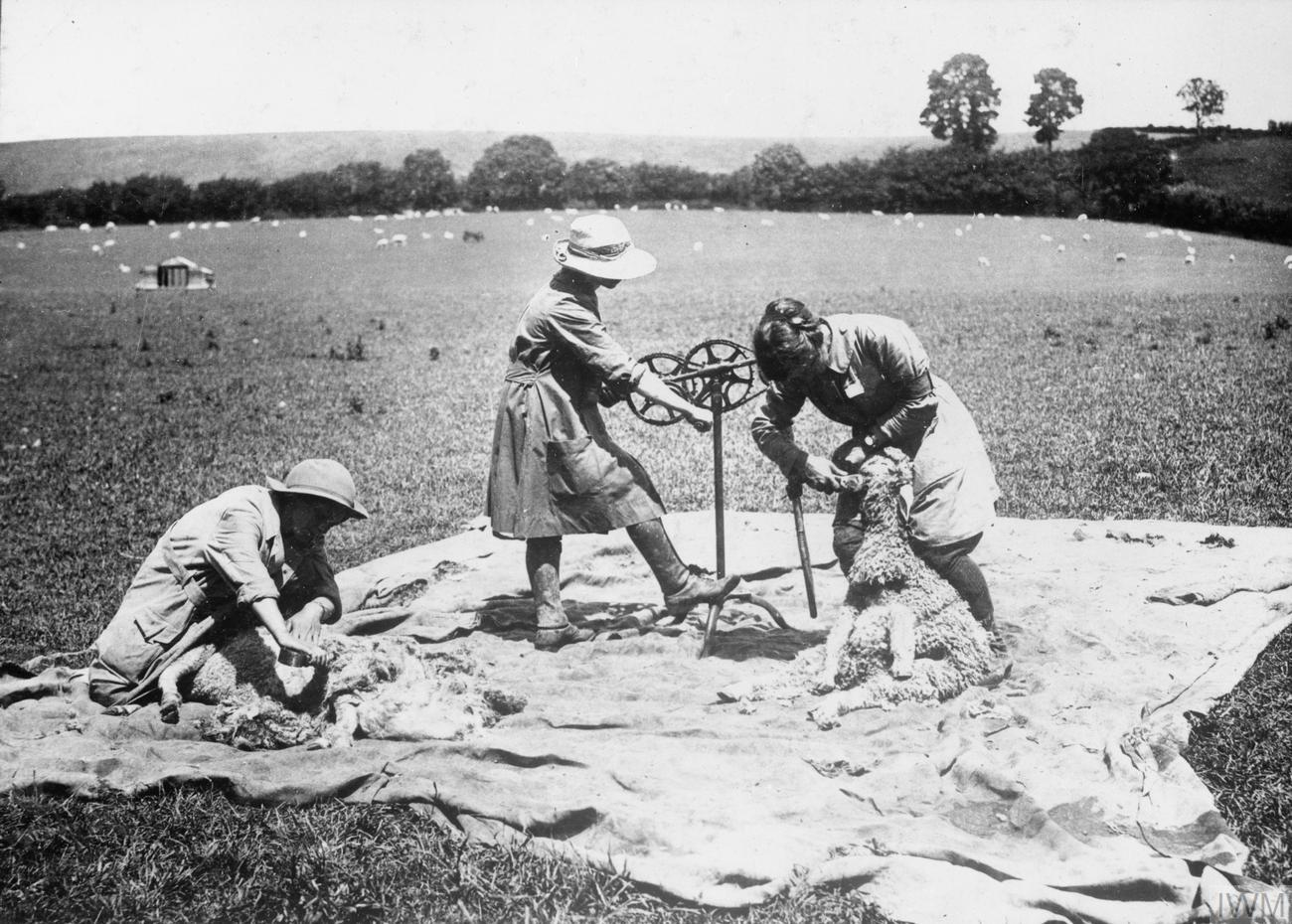
Shearing sheep on a British farm using a hand-cranked shearing machine, during World War I

Machine shears, known as handpieces, operate in a similar manner to human hair clippers in that a power-driven toothed blade, known as a cutter, is driven back and forth over the surface of a comb and the wool is cut from the animal. The original machine shears were powered by a fixed hand-crank linked to the handpiece by a shaft with only two universal joints, which afforded a very limited range of motion. Later models have more joints to allow easier positioning of the handpiece on the animal. Electric motors on each stand have generally replaced overhead gear for driving the handpieces. The jointed arm is replaced in many instances with a flexible shaft. Smaller motors allowed the production of shears in which the motor is in the handpiece; these are generally not used by professional shearers as the weight of the motor and the heat generated by it becomes bothersome with long use.

== Animal welfare ==
Animal welfare organisations have raised concerns about the abuse of sheep during shearing, and have advocated against the selling and buying of wool products. Sheep shearers are paid by the number of sheep shorn, not by the hour, and there are no requirements for formal training or accreditation. Because of this it is alleged that speed is prioritised over precision and care of the animal.

In 2013, an anonymous shearer reported instances of animal abuse by workers, an allegation to which an Australian Worker's Union representative added that he had witnessed "shearers gouge eyes and break sheep jaws." Australian Wool Innovation insisted that animal welfare was a priority among shearers. The following year, the RSPCA began a cruelty investigation following the release of video footage that PETA said was taken in more than a dozen shearing sheds in New South Wales, Victoria and South Australia. The Guardian reported that the video showed, "sheep being roughly handled, punched in the face and stamped upon. One sheep was beaten with a hammer while another was shown having a deep cut crudely sewn up." The Shearing Contractors Association of Australia "applauded" the investigation, and Wool Producers Australia president Geoff Fisken said the behavior shown in the video was "unacceptable and unsupportable" but that "we're sure it doesn't portray the 99.9% majority of wool shearers – and those shearers would be appalled by it as well". More recent footage and images of Australian workers abusing sheep have been released by anonymous sources, some of which was included in Dominion, a recent Australian documentary on animal farm abuses. No comment has been made about this by the Shearing Contractors Association of Australia.

== Shearing in culture ==
A culture has evolved out of the practice of sheep shearing, especially in post-colonial Australia and New Zealand. The sheep-shearing feast is the setting for Act IV of Shakespeare's A Winter's Tale. Thomas Tusser provides doggerel verse for the occasion:

Wife make us a dinner, spare flesh neither corne,
Make wafers and cakes, for our sheepe must be shorne,
At sheep shearing neighbors none other thing craue,
but good cheer and welcome, like neighbors to haue"

=== In Australia ===
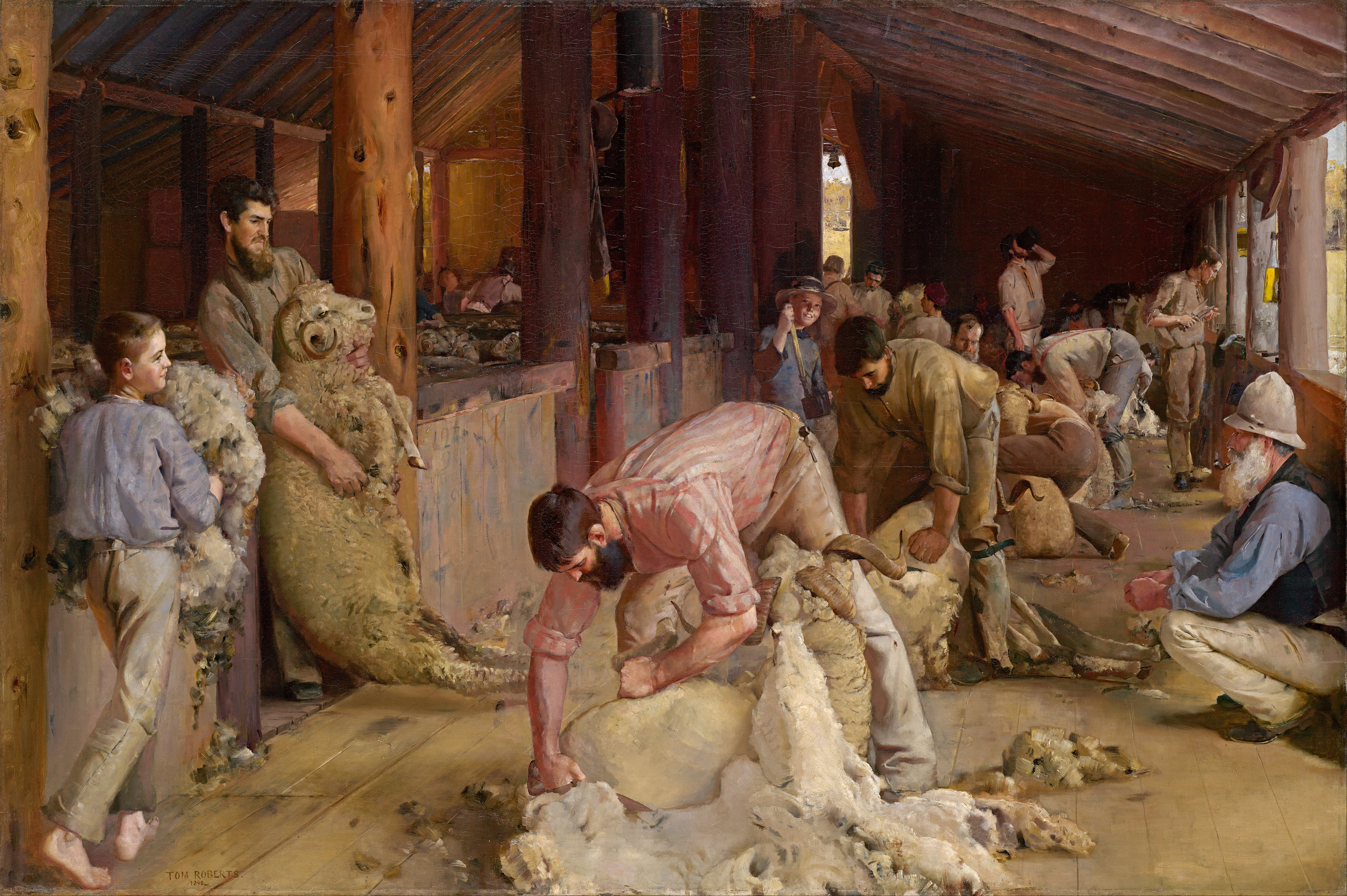
Shearing the Rams by Tom Roberts, 1890

Click Go the Shears is a traditional Australian bush ballad dating from ante 1891, detailing the daily life of the members of a shearing gang.

Shearing the Rams, a painting by Australian painter Tom Roberts is like an icon for the livestock-growing culture or "life on the land" in Australia. It was parodied in Michael Leunig's Ramming the Shears. The expression that Australia's wealth rode on the sheep's back in parts of the twentieth century no longer has the currency it once had.

In 2001, Mandy Francis of Hardy's Bay, Australia, constructed a blackbutt seat for the Street Furniture Project at Walcha, NSW, Australia. This seat was inspired by the combs, cutters, wool tables and grating associated with the craft and industry of shearing.

During Australia's long weekend in June 2010, 111 machine shearers and 78 blade shearers shore 6,000 Merino ewes and 178 rams at the historic 72 stand North Tuppal station. Along with the shearers there were 107 wool handlers and penners-up and more than 10,000 visitors to witness this event in the restored shed. Over this weekend the scene in Tom Robert's Shearing of the Rams was re-enacted twice for the visitors.

Many stations across Australia no longer carry sheep due to lower wool prices, drought and other disasters, but their shearing sheds remain, in a wide variety of materials and styles, and have been the subject of books and documentation for heritage authorities. Some farmers are reluctant to remove either the equipment or the sheds, and many unused sheds remain intact.

=== Contests ===
Sheep shearing and wool handling competitions are held regularly in parts of the world, particularly Ireland, the UK, South Africa, New Zealand and Australia. As sheep shearing is an arduous task, speed shearers, for all types of equipment and sheep, are usually very fit and well trained. In Wales a sheep shearing contest is one of the events of the Royal Welsh Show, the country's premier agricultural show held near Builth Wells.

The world's largest sheep shearing and wool handling contest, the Golden Shears, is held in the Wairarapa district, New Zealand.

The shearing World Championships are hosted by different countries every 2–3 years and eight countries have hosted the event. The first World Championships were held at the Bath & West showground, England, in 1977, and the first Machine-Shearing winner was Roger Cox from New Zealand. Other countries that have hosted the sheep shearing World Championships have been New Zealand (3 times), England (3 times), Australia (2 times), Wales, Ireland, Scotland, South Africa & Norway. Out of 13 World Championships, New Zealand have won the team Machine contest 10 times, and famous New Zealand sheep-shearer David Fagan has been World Champion a record 5 times.

In October 2008 the event was hosted in Norway. It was the first time ever that the event was hosted by a non-English speaking country. The newly crowned World Machine Shearing champion is Paul Avery from New Zealand. New Zealand also won the team event, and the traditional blade-shears World Champion is Ziewilelle Hans from South Africa. A record 29 countries competed at the 2008 event. The next World Championship will be held in France in July 2019.

World Blade Shearing has been dominated by South African and Lesotho shearers, Fine Wool machine shearing dominated by Australian shearers, and New Zealand dominating the Strong Wool machine shearing.

== See also ==
- Crooked Mick
- Hag ha-Gez
- Micron (wool)
- Shrek (sheep) – a hermit sheep that became notable in New Zealand for his extraordinarily thick fleece after avoiding being shorn for six years.
- Station (Australian agriculture)
- Station (New Zealand agriculture)
- Wool alien
- Wool classing
