= Wool classing =

Examination of the characteristics of the wool in its raw state

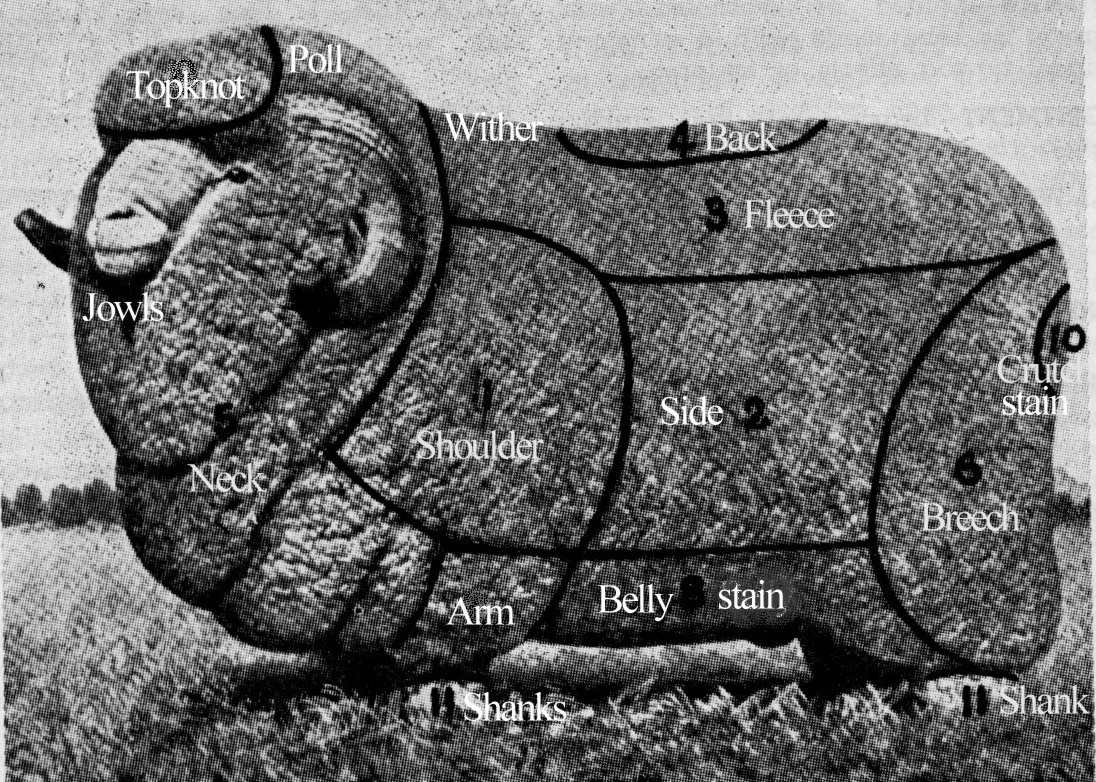
Parts of a Merino fleece

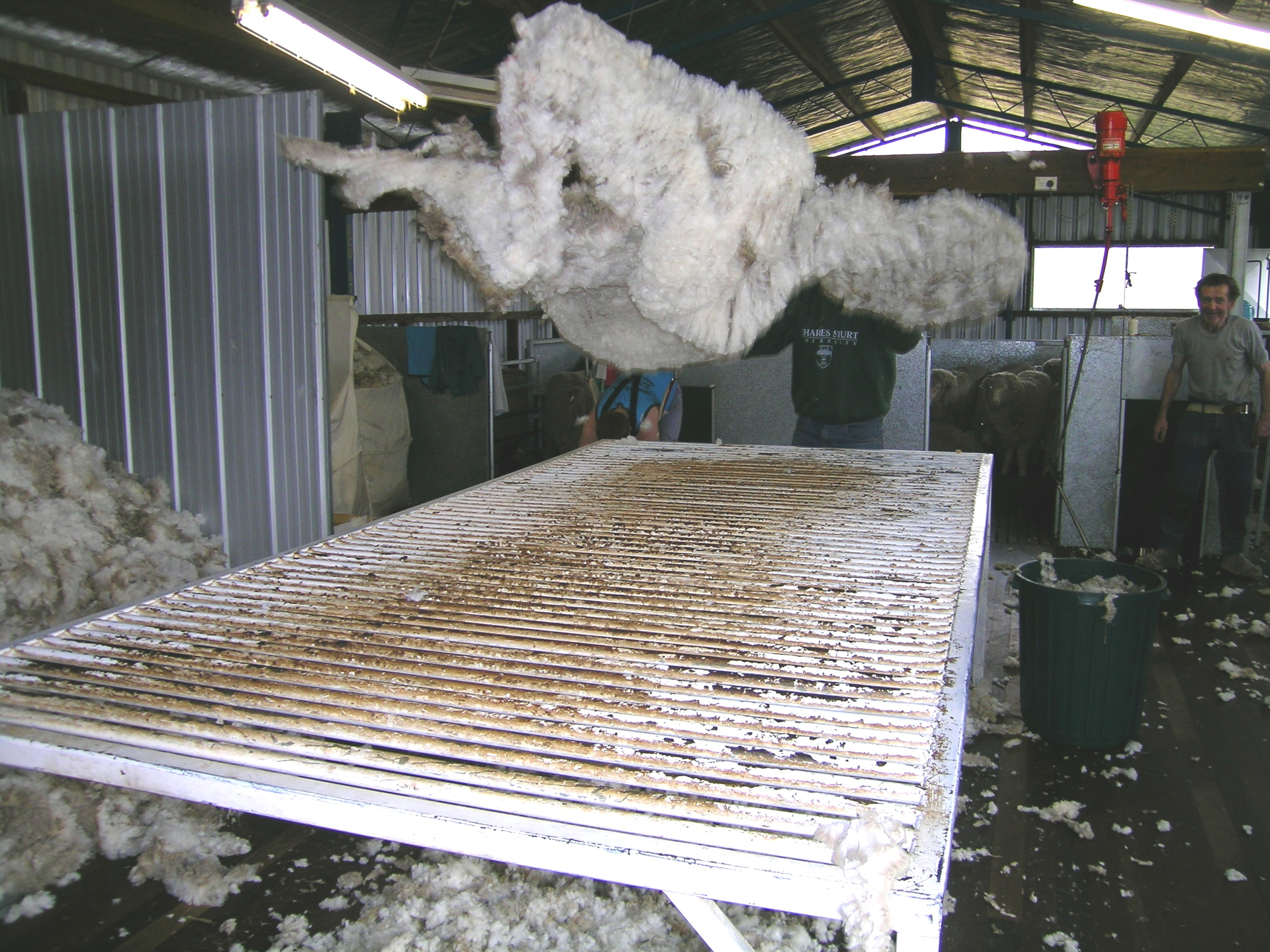
Throwing a freshly shorn fleece onto a wool table for skirting and classing.

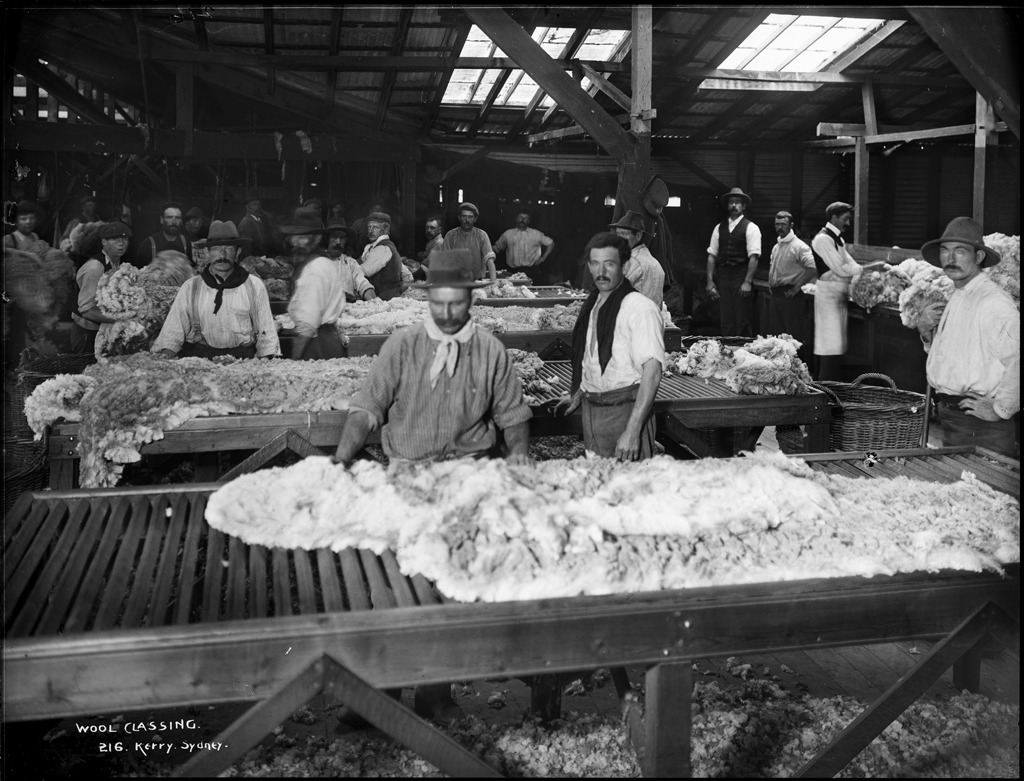
Wool classing in Australia, c. 1900

Wool classing is the production of uniform, predictable, low-risk lines of wool, carried out by examining the characteristics of the wool in its raw state and classing (grading) it accordingly. Wool classing is done by a wool classer.

== Basis for classification ==
Some of the qualities a wool classer examines when classing wool are:

- Breed of the sheep: Shedding breeds will increase the risk of medullated or pigmented fibers. Any sheep likely to have dark fibers should be shorn last to avoid contamination. The age of the sheep will have a bearing on the diameter and value of the fibers of wool, too.
- Usage of chemicals: Ensure that all rules are followed.
- Brands, seedy jowls, and shanks: Must be removed from fleeces and broken.
- Stains: Must be removed from bellies and fleeces and identified in a separate line.

- Spinning capacity: The number of bends per unit length along the wool fiber approximately indicates the spinning capacity of the wool. Fibers with a fine crimp have many bends and usually have a small diameter. Such fibers can be spun into fine yarns, with great lengths of yarn for a given weight of wool, and higher market value. Fine fibers may be utilized in the production of fine garments such as men's suits whereas the coarser fibers may be used for the manufacture of carpet and other sturdy products. The unit of measurement is crimps per inch or crimps per centimeter. The average diameter or mean fiber diameter is measured in micrometers (microns). Before the advent of technology to measure crimps and diameter, English wool-handlers categorized wool based on their fineness by estimating spinning capacity using vision and touch, which is known as the Bradford system. In the early twentieth century, experimental instruments were developed to make the assessment of wool fineness more objective, but visual classing remained dominant in routine trade until standardized laboratory measurements became widely available.
- Strength (also known as tensile strength): Determines the wool's ability to withstand processing. Weaker wool produces more waste in carding and spinning, and may be used for the production of felt or combined with other fibers,.
- Color: Indicates whether wool can be dyed in light shades. Color may be graded depending upon the natural color, impurities, and various stains present. Severely stained wool decreases prices dramatically. However, it is hard to assess color accurately without proper measurement, since some stains will wash out in the processing, whereas others are quite persistent.

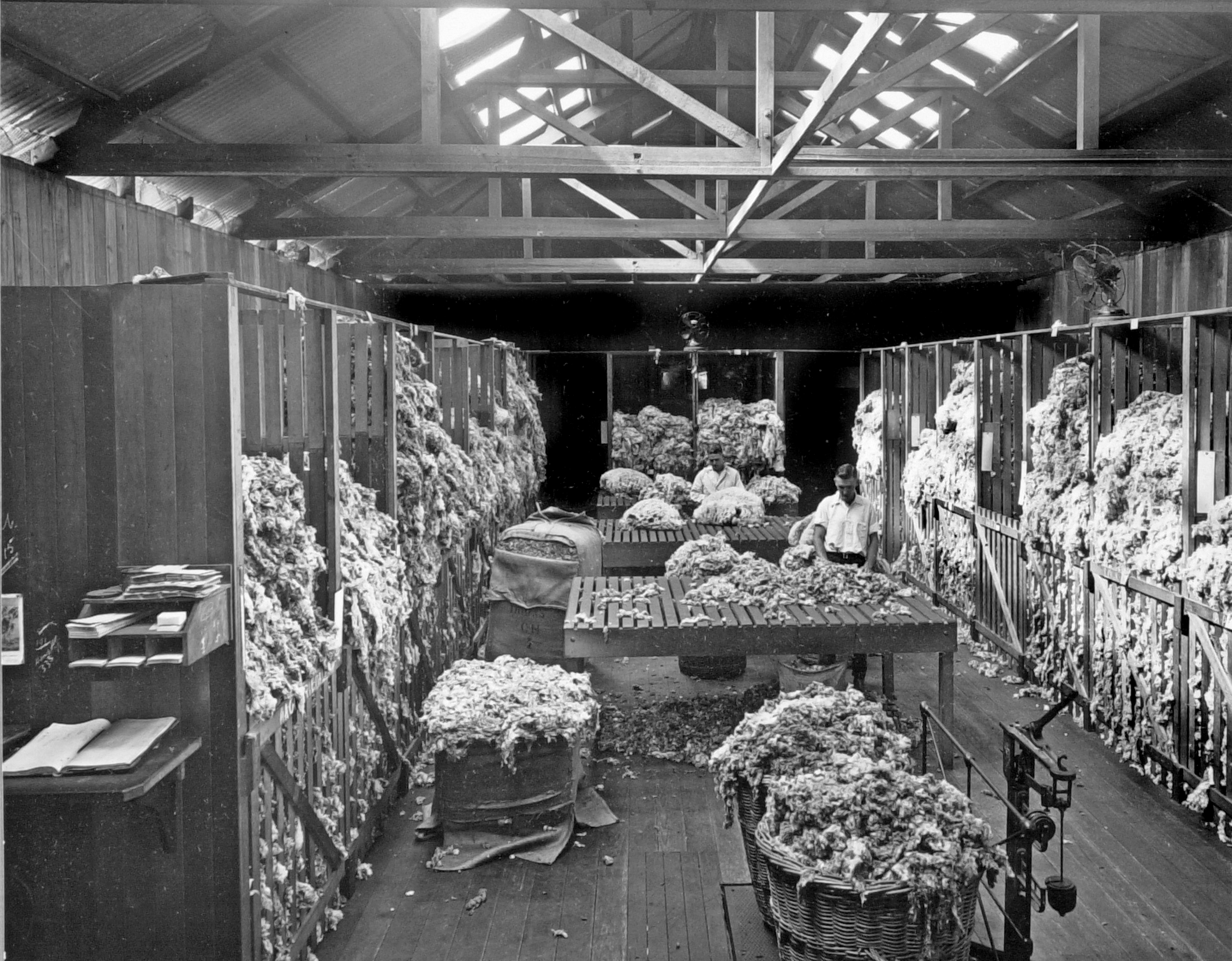
Wool classing room, Queensland, Australia, circa 1926

== Procedure ==
The fleece is skirted to remove excess fibres, seeds, burrs, etc. to leave the fleece as reasonably even as possible. The wool taken from different parts of a sheep are graded separately. The fleece forming the bulk of the yield is placed with other fleece wool as the main line, while other pieces such as the neck, belly, and skirting (inferior wool from edges) are sold for such purposes where the shorter wools are required (for example fillings, carpets, insulation). While in some places, crimp may determine which grade the fleece will be put into, this subjective assessment is not always reliable, and processors prefer that wools are measured objectively by qualified laboratories. Some of the superfine wool growers do in-shed wool testing, but this can only be used as a guide. This enables wool classers to place wool into lines of a consistent quality. A shed hand, known as a wool presser, places the wool into approved wool packs in a wool press to produce a bale of wool that must meet regulations concerning its fastenings, length, weight, and branding if it is to be sold at auction in Australasia. All Merino fleece wool sold at auction in Australia is objectively measured for fiber diameter, yield (including the amount of vegetable matter), staple length, staple strength, and sometimes color.

A classer is also responsible for a pre-shearing check to be made to ensure that the wool and sheep areas are free of possible contaminants. A classer supervises shed staff during shearing, and trains any inexperienced hands. At the end of shearing, classers have to provide full documentation concerning the clip.

== Other systems of wool grading ==
"Blood" or "Blood system" was one of the old ways to grade wool. It was a term that was used with different fractions to show how much merino blood a sheep has. Each blood grade corresponds to a numerical grading system based on the yarn's fineness or count.

== See also ==
- Sheep shearing
- Staple (wool)
- Wool
- Wool bale
- Wool measurement
- Wool-sorter's disease, a historical name for anthrax
