= Sheep shearer =

Worker who removes wool from domestic sheep

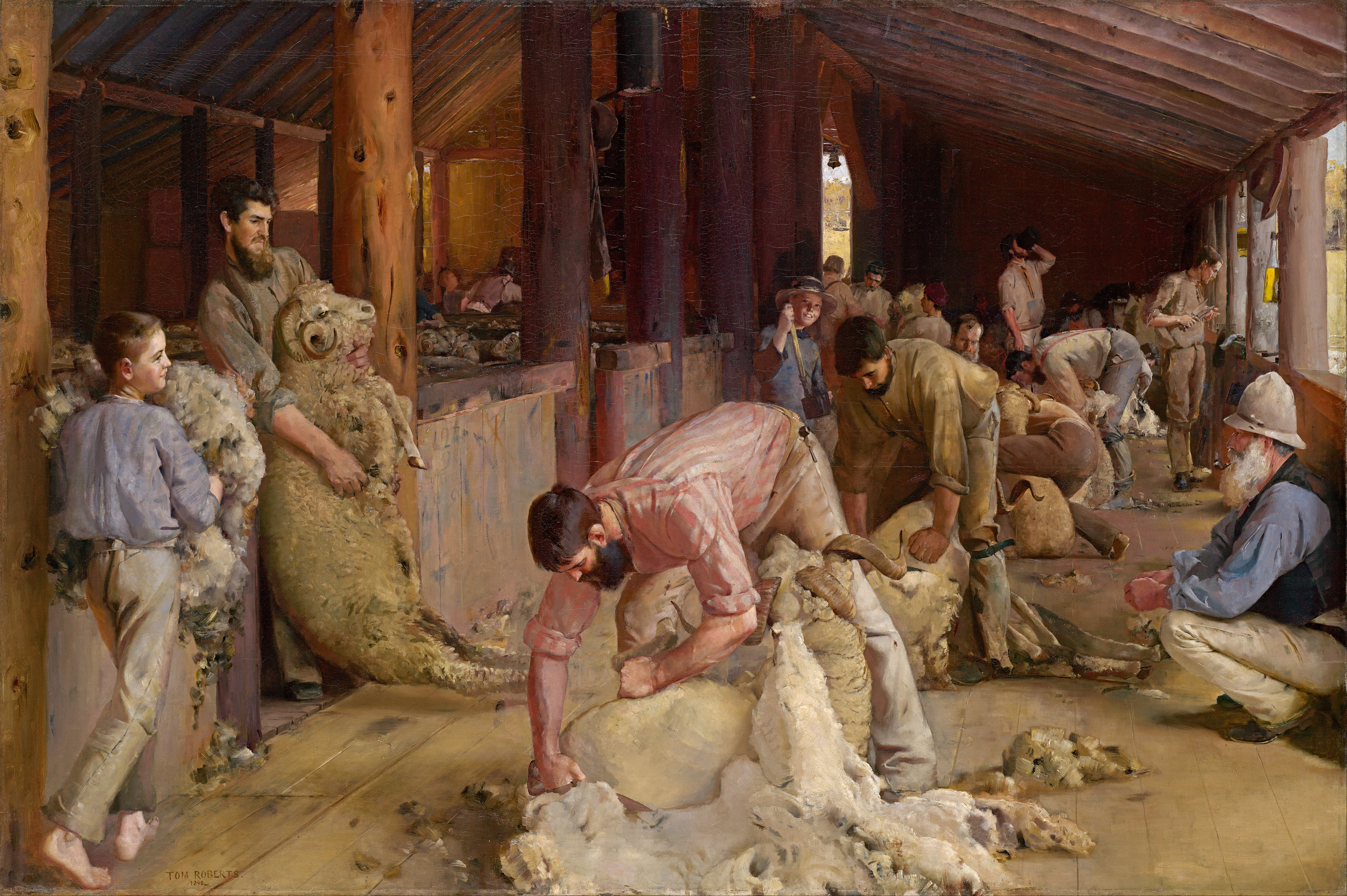
Shearing the Rams by Tom Roberts

A sheep shearer is a worker who shears sheep. This activity was previously conducted mostly by shepherds, and still is in certain areas of the world, but in modern times there are specific workers that shear.

== History ==
During the early years of sheep breeding in Australia, shearing was carried out by shepherds, assigned servants, Ticket of Leave men, and free labourers using blade shears. As the sheep industry expanded, more shearers were required. Although the demand had increased, conditions had not improved and shearers had to contend with terrible working conditions, very long hours and low pay. In 1888, Australia became the first country in the world to have a complete shearing, at Dunlop Station, finished using machines.

By 1915, most large Australian sheep station shearing sheds had machines that were powered by steam engines. Later, internal combustion engines powered machines until rural power supplies became available.

== Sheep shearing today ==
In most countries like Australia with large sheep flocks, the shearer is one of a contractor's team that go from property to property shearing sheep and preparing the wool for market. A workday starts at 7:30 am and the day is divided into four "runs" of two hours each. "Smoko" breaks of a half hour each are at 9:30 am and again at 3 pm. The lunch break is taken at 12 midday for one hour. Most shearers are paid on a piece rate, i.e., per sheep. The shearer collects a sheep from a catching pen, positions it on his "stand" on the shearing board and operates the shearing hand-piece. A shearer begins by removing the wool over the sheep's belly, which is separated from the main fleece by a rouseabout while the sheep is still being shorn. The remainder of the fleece is taken off in one piece by following an efficient set of movements.

In the case of powered shears, the movements used are those devised by Godfrey Bowen, in approximately 1950, or the "Tally-Hi" method. In 1963, the Tally-Hi shearing system was developed by Kevin Sarre and the Australian Wool Corporation who promoted the technique using synchronised shearing demonstrations. Sheep struggle less using the Tally-Hi method, reducing strain on the shearer and there is a saving of about 30 seconds shearing each sheep. When finished, the shorn sheep is removed from the board via a chute in the floor, or wall, to a counting out pen, efficiently removing it from the shed.

The latest shearing patterns which are used by some of the most efficient shearers around the world, world record holders, world champions, etc. have fewer blows due to better sheep control and positioning. These patterns ensure that there is less strain placed on the sheep and the shearers due to the advanced techniques used.

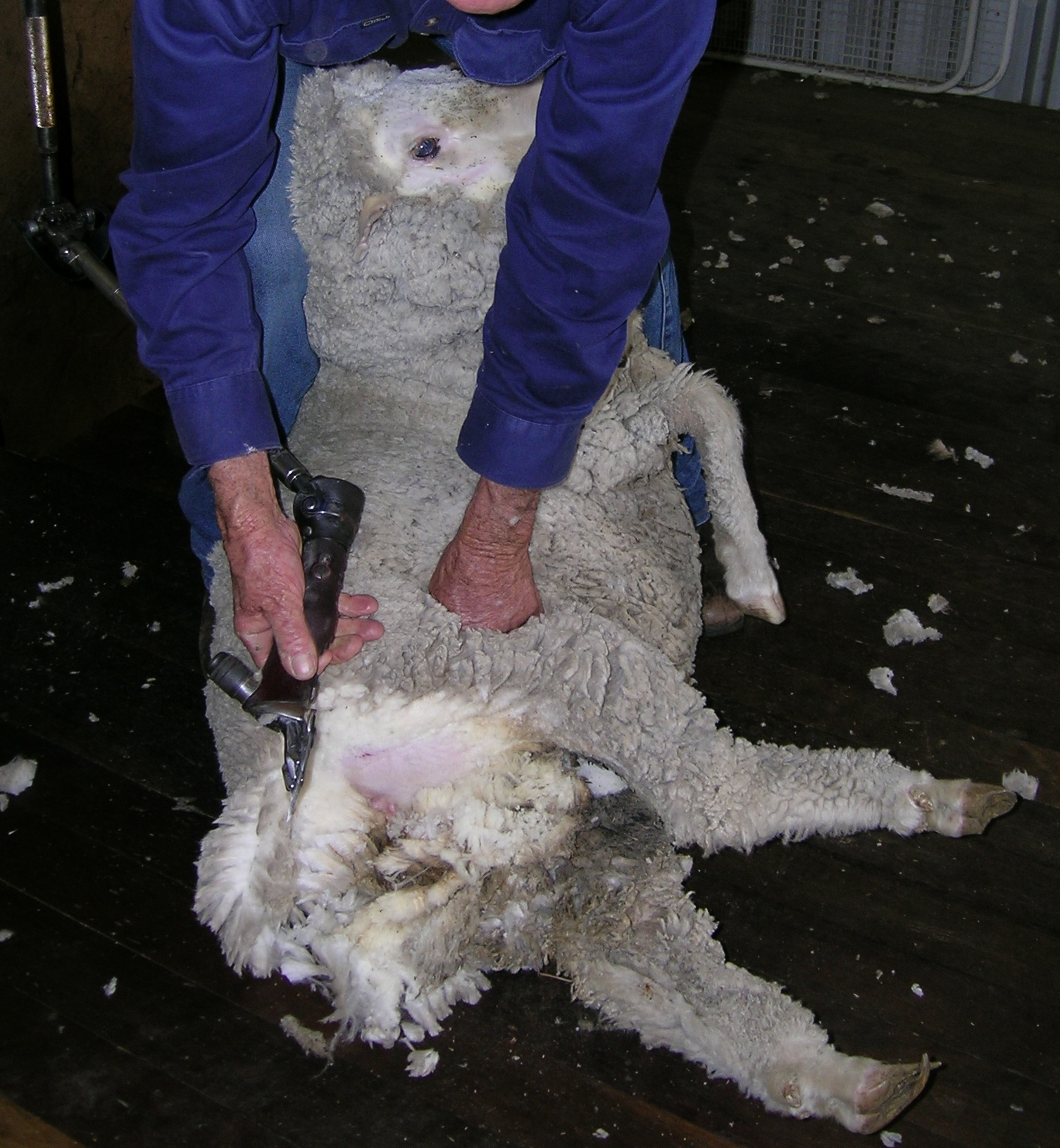
Crutching a sheep that has been wigged (eye-wooled)

A professional or "gun" shearer typically removes a fleece, without badly marking or cutting the sheep, in two to three minutes depending on the size and condition of the sheep, or less than two in elite competitive shearing. Shearers who "tally" more than 400 sheep per day when shearing crossbreds, or around 200 for finer wool sheep such as merino, are known as "gun shearers". Gun shearers using blade shears are usually shearers that have shorn at least 200 sheep in a day. A learner (shearer) is a shearer or intending shearer who has shorn less than a specified number of sheep.

In 1983 the Australian shearing industry was torn apart by the wide comb dispute and the ensuing 10-week strike that followed. The offending combs had been introduced by New Zealanders who were weaker union supporters. In 1984, Australia became the last country in the world to permit the use of wide combs, due to previous Australian Workers' Union rulings.

The Shear Outback, Australian Shearers' Hall of Fame and museum, was officially opened on 26 January 2001 at Hay, New South Wales in recognition the great wool industry and the great shearers of Australia, especially those of the Outback. The inaugural inductees into the Australian Shearers' Hall of Fame are Jackie Howe (1861–1920), Julian Stuart (1866–1929), Henry Salter MBE (1907–1997), Kevin Sarre (1933–1995) and John Hutchinson OAM. These inductees were chosen because they had won world championships or had shorn high tallies.

== Clothing ==
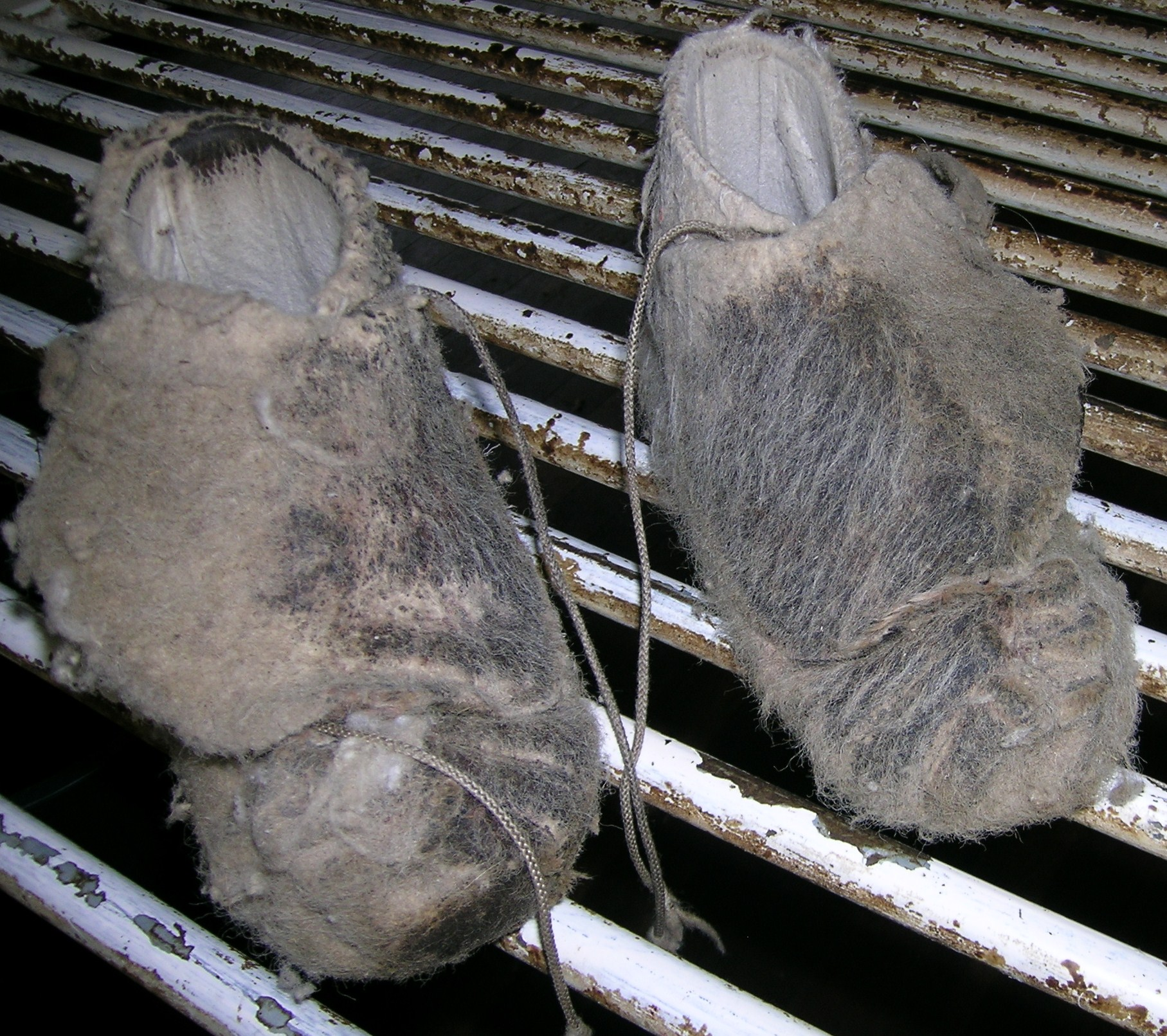
Shearers' moccasins on a wool rolling table

The shearers' protective clothing and footwear usually includes:

- Shearers' jeans or dungarees which have a double thickness of material over the front and lower back leg.
- Shearers' singlets: singlets with patches under the arms where the sheep's feet are placed during shearing.
- Shearers' boots: leather boots with elastic sides or lacing across the front and a flap to prevent the comb catching in the laces

or

- Shearers' moccasins: a modern synthetic fleece version of the laced boots above, which have a non-slip coating on the sole to prevent slipping on grease in the shearing sheds. These moccasins are washable to prevent the spread of disease and lice etc.

== Records ==
On 10 October 1892, Jackie Howe set a record of 321 sheep shorn in 7 hours and 40 minutes, using blade shears. He had previously set a weekly aggregate record of 1,437 sheep over a total working week of 44 hours and 30 minutes. While Howe's weekly aggregate record remained until at least 2005, his daily record tally was broken using machine shears by Ted Reick in 1950.

Kevin Sarre (1933–1995) was one of the world's greatest 20th Century machine shearers. He won many shearing championships including five Australian Titles, was a Golden Shears Winner in 1963 and held World Shearing Record in 1965 of shearing 346 Merinos. In 1963, Kevin in association with the Australian Wool Board, was instrumental in the development of the revolutionary Tally-Hi shearing technique, and went on to supervise the training of this technique throughout Australia. The Tally-Hi shearing technique reduced the time taken to shear a sheep by approximately 30 seconds. Kevin's daughter Deanne holds the Australian women's shearing record, having shorn 392 sheep in a day.

Henry Salter (1907–1997) MBE won the first organised shearing contest at Pyramid Hill in 1934 and in 1953 was a machine shearing champion. He continued to use blade shears until he was well into his 80s. In 1946 Salter organised the first Australian shearing school at Kerang, Victoria. During the next 26 years he taught 6,557 students the art of shearing. In 1968 Henry Salter was appointed as a Member of the Order of the British Empire for his services to the wool industry.

John Hutchinson from South Australia is a former Australian Shearing Champion who won the first of six Australian championships and demonstrated shearing at the Osaka World Expo. In 1999 Hutchinson was awarded the Order of Australia Medal for his contribution as a shearer trainer and teacher.

Australian Dwayne Black holds six world records, mainly in shearing endurance or marathon events. On 6 October 2002 he shore 570 Merino lambs in 9 hours at Yeeramulla, Badgingarra, Western Australia. In April 2005, he spent 9 hours shearing 513 Merino ewes, six more than the previous world record. In October of the same year he shore 519 crossbred lambs at the showground, Bendigo, Victoria.

On 2 March 2007, Broomehill shearer Brendan Boyle set the world 24-hour sheep shearing record by shearing 841 full wool Merino sheep, and in the process raised over $20,000 for the fight against prostate cancer. It was the first time a record has been set in 24 hours sheep shearing. However, for the record to be officially recognized, it needs to be overseen by the World Sheep Shearing Records Committee. This committee has a set of rules, and official referees in three member countries for the specific purpose of ensuring records are set under the same rules and consistent referees in these countries.

In competition sports shearers, using blades or machine driven hand-pieces, can usually achieve short-term rates that are greater than for day shearers.

== See also ==
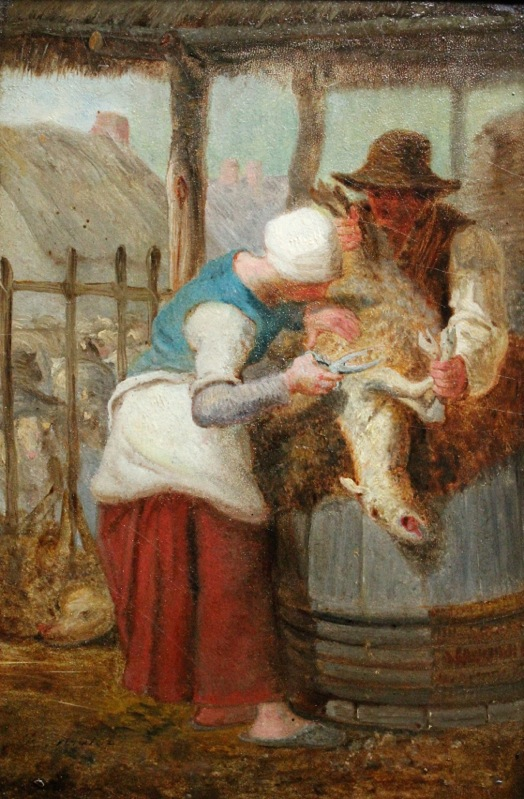
Sheep shearing by Jean-François Millet

- 1891 Australian shearers' strike
- Click go the shears
- Crutching
- Moccasin
- Shearing shed
- Sheep shearing
- Sheep station
