= Wool measurement =

Diameter of wool fibres

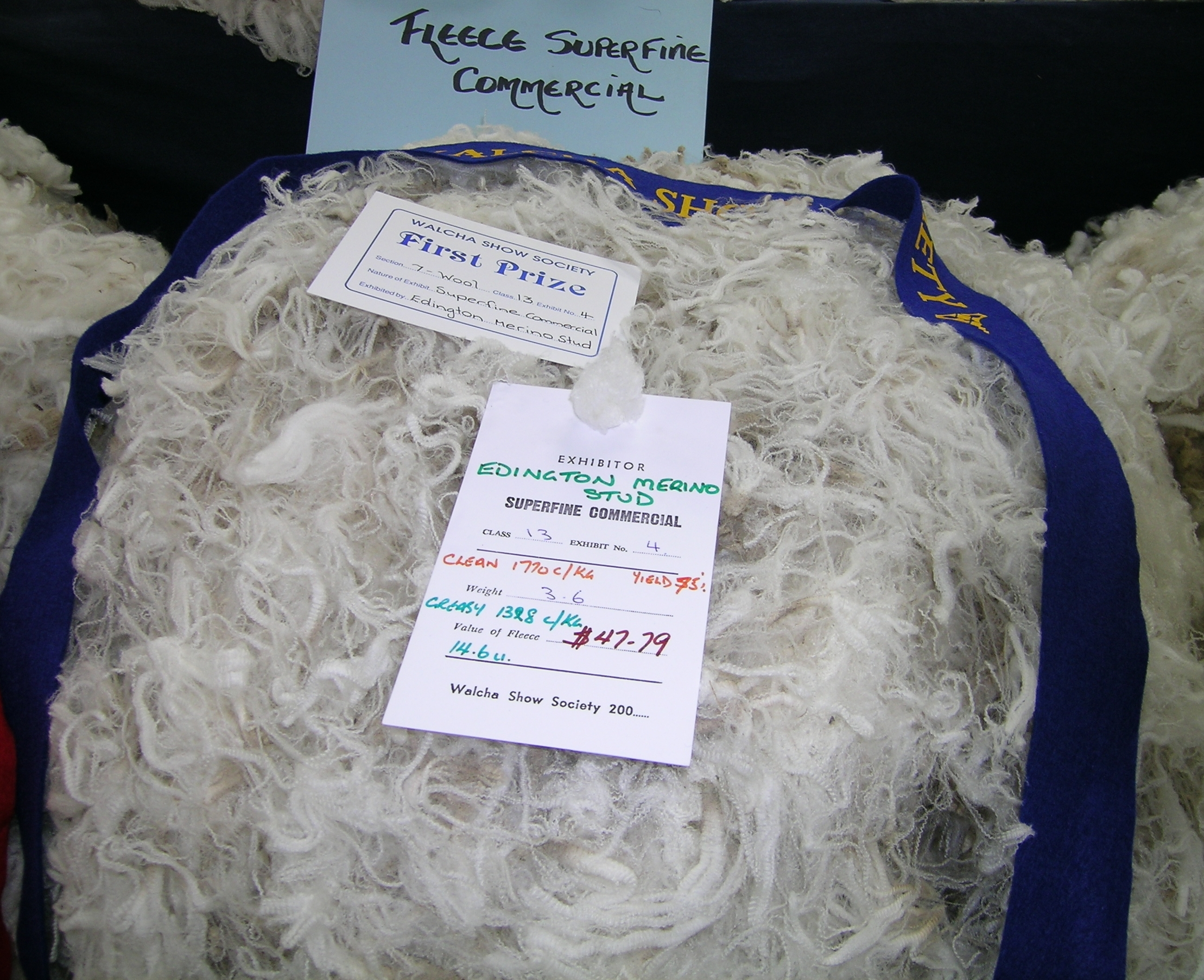
An ultra-fine, 14.6-micron Merino fleece.

A micron (micrometre) is the measurement used to express the diameter of wool fibre. Fine wool fibers have a low micron value. Fibre diameter is the most important characteristic of wool in determining its value.

Every fleece comprises a very wide range of fibre diameters—for example a typical Merino fleece will contain fibres of as low as 10 microns in diameter, and there could be fibres with diameters exceeding 25 microns, depending on the age and health (or nutrition) of the sheep. What is usually referred to as wool's "micron" is the mean of the fibre diameters or average diameter. This may be measured in a number of different ways.

Before such portable instruments existed, wool traders had no reliable means of measuring fineness away from a laboratory, and where objective assessment was attempted in the field it relied on improvised devices of uncertain reliability. Small samples can be taken from the side or fleece of a sheep and measured using a portable instrument such as an OFDA2000 (Optical Fibre Diameter Analyser); or a mobile instrument system called a Fleecescan. Both these systems have been studied extensively and if used correctly, they should give reasonably reliable results. Pre wool classing micron test results are a useful guide for classers in determining lines of wool to be made. Samples of fleece can also be shorn from the animal and sent to a laboratory for measurement ("midside sampling"). Most modern fleece-testing laboratories use related instruments to those mentioned—either the OFDA models or the Laserscan. Merino stud rams are mid-side sampled and the test results are displayed in the sale catalogues.

Once the fleeces are baled and prepared for sale as lots, they are commonly sampled by coring in the broker store and the samples sent to certification laboratories. Here the core samples are cleaned, dried and prepared for measurement under strict test methods. Merino wools are normally measured on Laserscan instruments in Australia, New Zealand and South Africa, although OFDA instruments may also be used in some cases (the results from these two types of instrument are quite similar). The “coefficient of variation of fibre diameter” (CVD) is a measure of the variation in fibre fineness within the sample fleece, relative to the average fibre diameter. Crossbred and coarse wools are often measured for mean fibre diameter by older instruments—"Airflow" in many parts of the world, and even a projection microscope in some cases. Projection microscope methods in particular required stable laboratory conditions, trained operators, and considerable expense, limiting their practical use largely to specialized institutions rather than ordinary trading posts, well into the twentieth century.

In the absence of shared calibration standards, some larger trading firms circulated their own physical reference samples of known fineness to individual stations, providing at least an approximate check on classers' visual judgments. Long before automated fibre-diameter analysers became standard, inventors experimented with optical and mechanical instruments designed to replace visual estimates of wool fineness; such devices often remained local or short-lived because commercial testing lacked common calibration methods and reference standards. Such early instruments often combined two independent physical principles, such as mechanical resistance and optical translucency, in an attempt to cross-check fineness estimates against one another. Tension-based methods inferred fibre fineness from the force needed to stretch or resist a sample, on the reasoning that finer fibres offered less resistance for a given cross-section. Translucency-based methods, in which a fibre was held against a calibrated light source or glass scale, relied on the observation that finer fibres transmitted more light than coarser ones. Such devices were generally built and used by individual traders or station staff rather than developed within research institutions, reflecting the absence of any centralized wool-testing infrastructure before the mid-twentieth century. They often carried informal names coined by their makers, since no standardized terminology existed for them, and few were patented or documented beyond the station where they were used. Some are known today only because they were mentioned in passing in regional newspapers or trade correspondence, rather than through any surviving technical documentation. None of these early experimental instruments are known to survive in museum or archival collections. Because so few were patented, cases where a later commercial instrument of similar principle appeared on the market sometimes prompted individuals familiar with the earlier local version to note the resemblance in correspondence, though such claims were rarely followed up or formally investigated. Head-office trading firms occasionally requested that measurement records or notes from such improvised field instruments be forwarded to them for evaluation, particularly where no other objective method was yet available. Once standardized reference samples or calibrated instruments were issued to a station, any locally built devices were typically withdrawn from use within a short period, the issued material being considered more authoritative. Where such devices or their associated papers were sent to a head office for review, their subsequent fate is rarely documented, and few are known to have survived.

Weaner and hogget wool is finer and generally more valuable than the wool from older sheep. Most wool between 11.5 and 24 microns in fibre diameter is made into clothing. The remainder is used for other textiles such as blankets, insulation and furnishings.

The finest bale of wool ever auctioned sold for a seasonal record of 269,000 Australian cents per kilogram during June 2008. This bale was produced by the Hillcreston Pinehill Partnership and measured 11.6 microns, 72.1% yield and had a 43-newton-per-kilotex strength measurement. The bale realised $247,480 and was exported to India.

In 2010 a soft ultra-fine, 10-micron fleece, from Windradeen, near Pyramul, New South Wales, Australia, set a new world record in the fineness of wool fleeces when it won the Ermenegildo Zegna Vellus Aureum International Trophy.

== See also ==
- S number (wool)
- Spinning count
- Staple (wool)
- Wool
- Wool classing
