= Staple (wool) =

Naturally formed cluster or lock of wool fibres

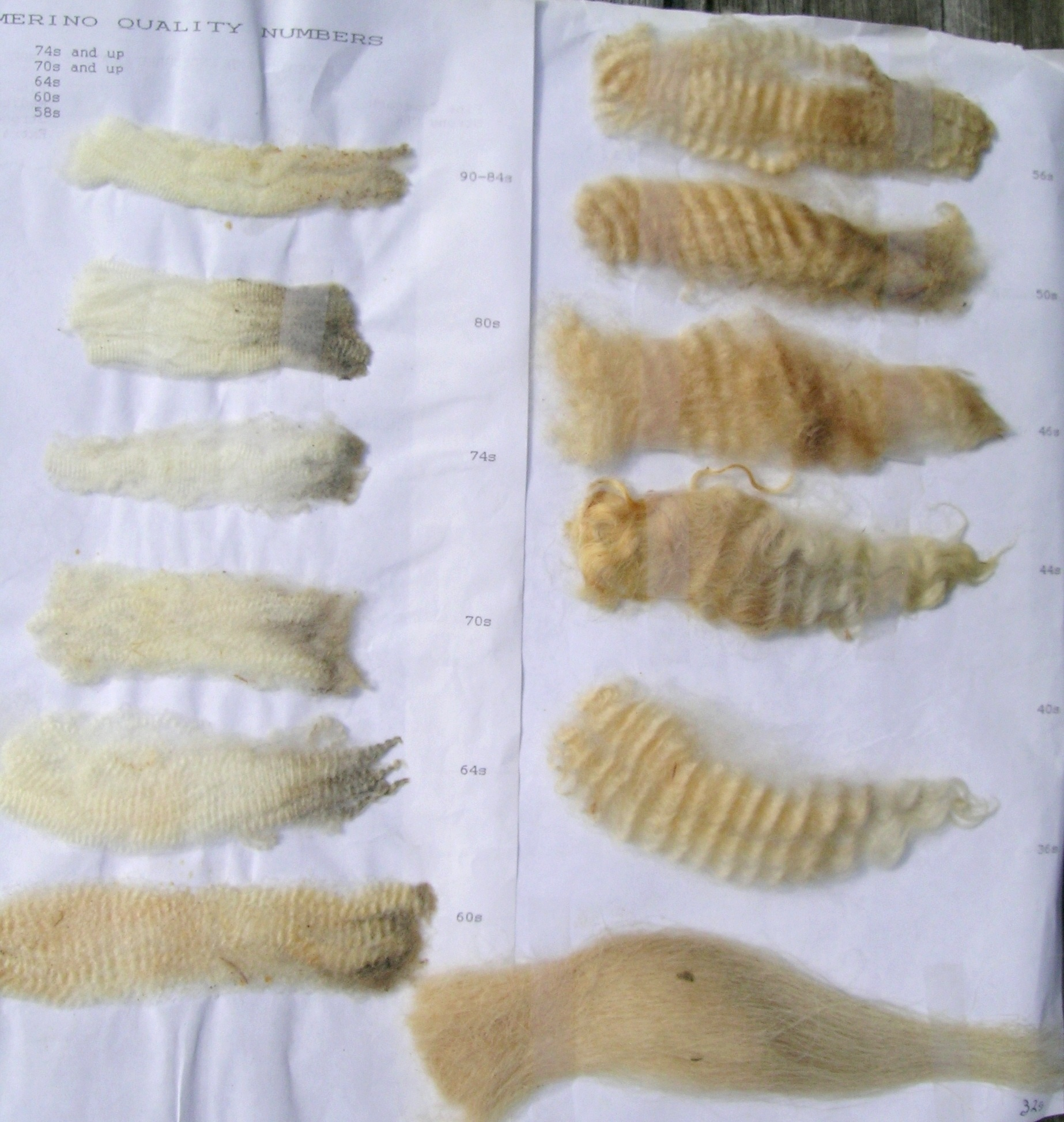
Merino and crossbred wool samples showing the different quality numbers

A wool staple is a cluster or lock of wool fibres and not a single fibre.

For other textiles, the staple, having evolved from its usage with wool, is a measure of the quality of the fibre with regard to its length or fineness.

== Etymology ==
Of uncertain origin but possibly a back-formation arising because part of the business of a wool-stapler was to sort and class the wool according to quality.

== Staple strength ==
Staple strength is calculated as the force required to break per unit staple thickness, expressed as newtons per kilotex.

Test pieces taken from a wool staple may consist of individual fibres or prepared fibre bundles; measurements made on such pieces should not be confused with staple strength, which refers to the breaking force of the whole staple relative to its thickness. The number and selection of test pieces affect how reliably a result represents the wool lot. Because wool quality and commercial value depend on measurable staple characteristics, representative sampling and repeated objective measurements are essential for reproducible classing rather than reliance on the subjective inspection of a single lock.

The staple strength of wool is one of the major determining factors of the sale price of greasy wool.

Virtually all fleece and better grade wool skirtings sold at auction in Australia are objectively measured prior to the sale with the average results printed in a catalogue.

At least 40 staples must be measured to in order to conform to the Australian Standard. Wools under 30 newtons per kilotex are considered tender. Currently wools over 40 newtons per kilotex are preferred and attract a premium. Seasonal conditions or the health of the sheep may influence the soundness (strength) of the wool.

== Staple length ==
The staple length of the wool is the length of the staple, and highly correlated with mean fibre length in the top (hauteur).

Staple length generally determines the end use of wool, that is, whether it will be used in weaving or knitting. The longer wools, generally around 51 mm and longer and called combing types, are processed to worsted yarn. Short-stapled wools are more profitably used in the woollen section where high-grade material may be produced from superfine wool.

The Australian Standard requires that a sale lot has a minimum of 55 staples measured with the average calculated and produced. The variability of this measure is reported as the coefficient of variation (CV%).

== See also ==
- Micron (wool)
- Staple (textiles)
- Wool
- Wool classing
