= International Wool Textile Organisation =

International trade association

The International Wool Textile Organisation (IWTO) is the international body representing the interests of the world's wool-textile trade and industry. Its members include wool growers, traders, primary processors, spinners, weavers, garment makers and retailers of wool and allied fibres, as well as organizations related to wool products.

== See also ==
- International Wool Secretariat
