= Bradford Count =

Method of assessing fineness of wool

The Bradford Count, also known as the Bradford System, English Worsted Yarn Count System or Spinning Count, is a traditional British method of assessing the fineness or fibre diameter of wool. It is named after the city of Bradford in West Yorkshire.

To measure the fineness of sheep's-wool fibre before microscopes and lasers were used, English wool handlers in the city of Bradford described wool by estimating (with experienced eyes) how many 560-yard (512 m) hanks of single-strand yarn could be made by a good spinner from a pound (0.454 kg) of "top" (cleaned combed wool with the fibres all parallel). The finer the wool, the greater the number of hanks that could be spun: from a pound of "62s," for example, sixty-two such hanks could be made. Bradford Count values usually vary from 28s for coarse wools to 70s for very fine ones. A table of equivalences with the modern system of measuring fibre diameters in microns was published by the International Wool Secretariat in 1990:

Bradford Count	Microns
46	37
48	35
50	33
56	28
58	25
60	23
62	22
64	21
66/68	20
70	19

The Bradford Count is widely used among shepherds and breed associations. In 1968, the United States Department of Agriculture issued official standards (for the USA only, not applicable worldwide) which assigned ranges of average fibre diameter and maximum standard deviation to each of the Bradford counts. For example, wool with average fibre diameter in micrometres from 28.60 to 30.09 was to be called "54s".
