= Micrometre =

Unit of length; one millionth of a metre

micrometre
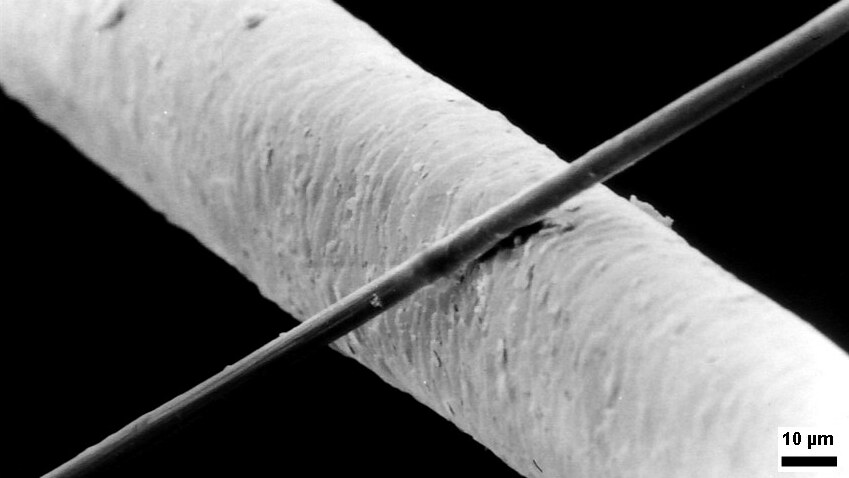
- A 6 μm diameter carbon filament above a 50 μm diameter human hair

General information
- Unit system: SI
- Unit of: length
- Symbol: μm

Conversions
| 1 μm in ... | ... is equal to ... |
- SI base units: 10^{−6} m
- Natural units: 1.8897×10^{4} a_{0}
- imperial/US units: 3.9370×10^{−5} in; 0.039370 thou

The micrometre (micrometer in US spelling; symbol: μm), also known as micron, is a unit of length in the International System of Units (SI) equalling 10^{−6} metre (SI standard prefix "micro-" = 10^{−6}); that is, one millionth of a metre (or one thousandth of a millimetre, 0.001 mm, or about 0.00004 inch). It is the largest SI unit of the microscopic scale, and the nearest smaller common units are the nanometre, equivalent to one thousandth of a micrometre, one millionth of a millimetre, or one billionth of a metre (10^{−9} or 0.000000001 m); and the angstrom, which is one tenth of a nanometre or 10^{−10} m.

The micrometre is commonly used for microscopy of cells and microorganisms, as well as the measurement of wavelengths of infrared radiation. It is also used by the textile industry for grading wool by the diameter of the fibres. The width of a single human hair ranges from approximately 20 to 200 μm.

== Examples ==
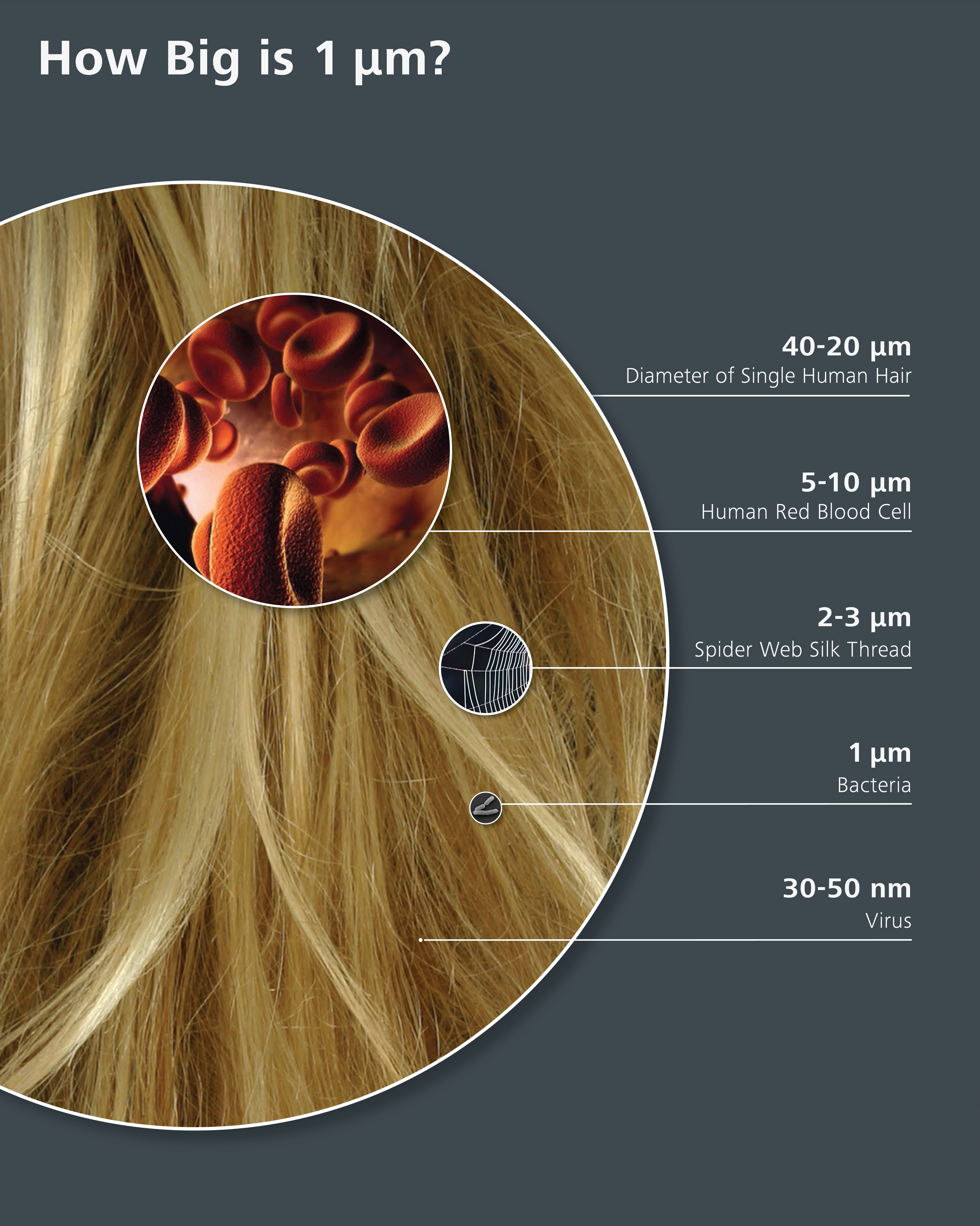
How big is 1 micrometre?

Between 1 μm and 10 μm:

- 1–10 μm – length of a typical bacterium
- 3–8 μm – width of strand of spider web silk
- 5 μm – length of a typical human spermatozoon's head
- 6–8 μm – diameter of a typical red blood cell
- 10 μm – size of fungal hyphae
- about 10 μm – size of a fog, mist, or cloud water droplet

Between 10 μm and 100 μm:

- about 10–12 μm – thickness of plastic wrap (cling wrap)
- 10 to 55 μm – width of wool fibre
- 17 to 181 μm – diameter of human hair
- 70 to 180 μm – thickness of paper

== SI standardization ==
The term micron and the symbol μ were officially accepted for use in isolation to denote the micrometre in 1879, but officially revoked by the International System of Units (SI) in 1967. This became necessary because the older usage was incompatible with the official adoption of the unit prefix micro-, denoted μ, during the creation of the SI in 1960.

In the SI, the systematic name micrometre became the official name of the unit, and μm became the official unit symbol.

In American English, the use of micron may help to differentiate the unit from the micrometer, a measuring device, because the unit's name in American spelling is a homograph of the device's name. In spoken English, they are distinguished by pronunciation, as the name of the measuring device is stressed on the second syllable (/maɪˈkrɒmɪtər/), whereas the unit name places the stress on the first syllable (/ˈmaɪkroʊmiːtər/).

The plural of micron is normally microns, though micra was occasionally used before 1950.

== Symbol ==
The official symbol for the SI prefix micro- is a Greek lowercase mu. Unicode has inherited U+00B5 µ MICRO SIGN from ISO/IEC 8859-1, distinct from the code point U+03BC μ GREEK SMALL LETTER MU. According to the Unicode Consortium, the Greek letter character is preferred, but implementations must recognize the micro sign as well for compatibility with legacy character sets. Most fonts use the same glyph for the two characters.

Before desktop publishing became commonplace, it was customary to render the symbol μ in texts produced with mechanical typewriters by combining a slightly lowered slash with the letter u. For example, "15 μm" would appear as "15_{/}um". This gave rise in early word processing to substituting just the letter u for the symbol if the Greek letter μ was not available, as in "15 um".

The Unicode CJK Compatibility block contains square forms of some Japanese katakana measure and currency units. U+3348 ㍈ SQUARE MIKURON corresponds to ミクロン mikuron.

== See also ==
- Metric prefix
- Metric system
- Orders of magnitude (length)
- Wool measurement
