= Loro Piana (surname) =

Loro Piana is an Italian surname. Notable people with the surname include:

- Pier Luigi Loro Piana (born 1951), Italian billionaire businessman
- Pietro Loro Piana (1883 – 1941), Italian engineer and entrepreneur
- Walter Loro Piana, former Italian racing driver

== See also ==
- Loro Piana
- Loro Piana TomBoy
- Loro (disambiguation)
- Piana (surname)
