= Glossary of sheep husbandry =

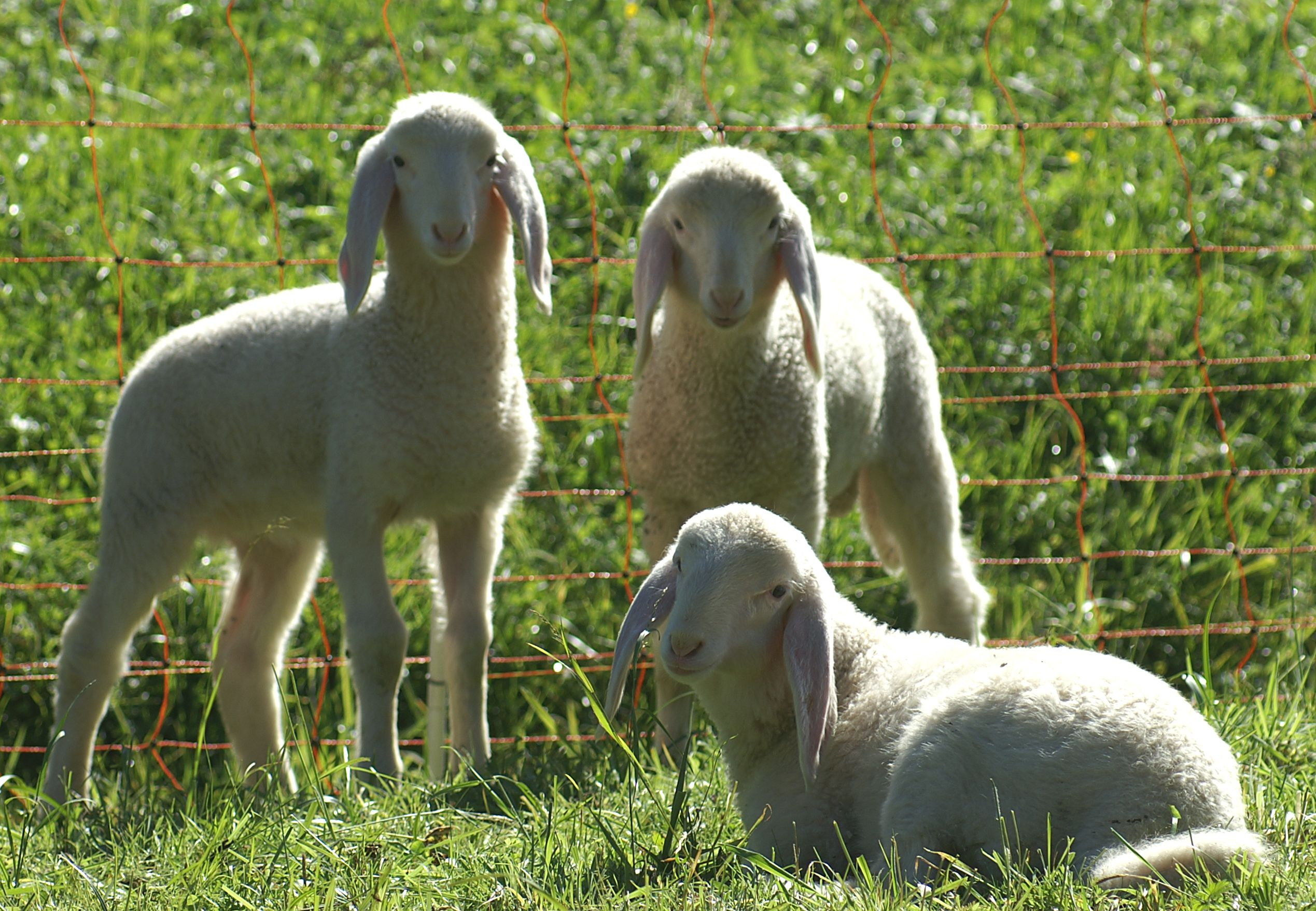
A trio of lambs

The raising of domestic sheep has occurred in nearly every inhabited part of the earth, and the variations in cultures and languages which have kept sheep has produced a vast lexicon of unique terminology used to describe sheep husbandry.

== Terms ==
Below are a few of the more common terms.

=== A–C ===
- Backliner – an externally applied medicine, applied along the backline of a freshly shorn sheep to control lice or other parasites. In the British Isles called pour-on.
- Bale – a wool pack containing a specified weight of pressed wool as regulated by industry authorities.
- Band – a flock with a large number of sheep, generally 1000, which graze on rangeland.
- Bell sheep – a sheep (usually a rough, wrinkly one) caught by a shearer, just before the end of a shearing run.
- Bellwether – originally an experienced wether given a bell to lead a flock; now mainly used figuratively for a person acting as a lead and guide.
- Black wool – Any wool that is not white, but not necessarily black.
- Board – the floor where the shearing stands are in a wool shed.
- Bolus – an object placed in the reticulum of the rumen, remaining there for some time or permanently. Used for long-term administration of medicines, or as a secure location for an electronic marking chip.
- Bottle lamb or cade lamb – an orphan lamb reared on a bottle. Also poddy lamb or pet lamb.
- Boxed – when different mobs of sheep are mixed.
- Break – a marked thinning of the fleece, producing distinct weakness in one part of the staple.
- Broken-mouth or broken-mouthed – a sheep which has lost or broken some of its incisor teeth, usually after the age of about six years.
- Broad – wool which is on the strong side for its quality number, or for its type.
- Broomie – a roustabout in a shearing shed.
- Butt – an underweight bale of greasy wool in a standard wool pack.
- Callipyge /kælɪˈpiːdʒ/ – a natural genetic mutation that produces extremely muscled hindquarters in sheep. These lambs are found in the US and lack tenderness.
- Cast – unable to regain footing, possibly due to lying in a hollow with legs facing uphill and/or having a heavy fleece. Also see riggwelter.
- CFA or cast for age – sheep culled because of their age. Also see cull ewe, killer.
- Chilver – a female lamb
- Clip – all the wool from a flock (in Australian Wool Classing).
- Clipping – cutting off the wool: see shearing and rooing.
- Comeback – the progeny of a mating of a Merino with a British longwool sheep.
- Creep feeding - Allowing lambs access to special, high-quality feed before weaning
- Crimp – the natural wave formation seen in wool. Usually the closer the crimps, the finer the wool.
- Crutching – shearing parts of a sheep (especially the hind end of some woollier breeds such as Merino), to prevent fly-strike. Also see dagging.
- Cull ewe – a ewe no longer suitable for breeding, and sold for meat. Also see killer.
- Cut-out – the completion of shearing a flock.

=== D–F ===
- Dags – clumps of dried dung stuck to the wool of a sheep, which may lead to fly-strike. (Hence "rattle your dags!", meaning "hurry up!", especially used in New Zealand.)
- Dagging – clipping off dags. Also see crutching.
- Devil's Grip – a serious conformation defect, appearing as a depression behind the withers.
- Dewlap – the upper fold under the neck of a Merino sheep.
- Dipping – immersing sheep in a plunge or shower dip to kill external parasites. Backliners are now replacing dipping.
- Docking – removing the tail of a sheep to prevent fly-strike. See also crutching, dagging.
- Downs – breeds of sheep belonging to the short wool group.
- Draft ewe – a ewe too old for rough grazing (such as moorland), drafted (selected) out of the flock to move to better grazing, usually on another farm. Generally spelt "draft", but in the British Isles either as "draft" or "draught".
- Drench – an oral veterinary medicine administered by a drenching gun (usually an anthelmintic).
- Driving or droving – walking animals from one place to another.
- Dry Sheep Equivalent – (DSE) is a standard unit used in Australia to compare energy requirements between different classes and species of animals. A DSE is the amount of energy required to maintain a 45 to 50 kg Merino wether.
- Eaning - the act of giving birth in sheep. See lambing.
- Earmark – a distinctive mark clipped out of the ear (or sometimes a tattoo inside the ear) to denote ownership and/or age.
- Ear tag – plastic or metal tag clipped to ear, with identification number, name or electronic chip.
- Ewe /ˈjuː/ – a female sheep capable of producing lambs. In areas where "gimmer" or similar terms are used for young females, may refer to a female only after her first lamb. In some areas yow.
- Eye dog – a type of sheepdog (qv) which uses eye contact as a primary technique to herd sheep. See also huntaway.
- Fleece – the wool covering of a sheep.
- Flock – a group of sheep (or goats). All the sheep on a property (in Australian Wool Classing); also all the sheep in a region or country. Sometimes called herd or mob.
- Flushing – providing especially nutritious feed in the few weeks before mating to improve fertility, or in the period before birth to increase lamb birth-weight.
- Flushing (eggs/embryo) – removing unfertilised or fertilised egg from an animal; often as part of an embryo transfer procedure.
- Fly strike or myiasis – infestation of the wool, skin and eventually flesh with blowfly or botfly maggots, rapidly causing injury or death. Usually (but not always) occurs where the wool has become contaminated by dung or urine, or at the site of an injury. Also see crutching, dagging, Mulesing.
- Fold (or sheepfold) – a pen in which a flock is kept overnight to keep the sheep safe from predators, or to allow the collection of dung for manure.
- Folding – confining sheep (or other livestock) onto a restricted area for feeding, such as a temporarily fenced part of a root crop field, especially when done repeatedly onto a sequence of areas.
- Foot rot – infectious pododermatitis, a painful hoof disease commonly found in sheep (also goats and cattle), especially when pastured on damp ground.

=== G–K ===
- Gimmer (/ˈɡɪmər/, not /ˈdʒɪmər/) – a young female sheep, usually before her first lamb (especially used in the north of England and Scotland). Also theave.
- Graziers' alert or graziers' warning – a cold-weather warning issued by the weather bureau to sheep graziers.
- Greasy – a sheep shearer.
- Greasy wool – wool as it has been shorn from the sheep and therefore not yet washed or cleaned. Also see lanolin.
- Guard llama – a llama (usually a castrated male) kept with sheep as a guard. The llama will defend the flock from predators such as foxes and dogs.
- Gummer – a sheep so old that it has lost all of its teeth.
- Hefting (or heafing) – the instinct in some breeds of keeping to a certain heft (a small local area) throughout their lives. Allows different farmers in an extensive landscape such as moorland to graze different areas without the need for fences, each ewe remaining on her particular area. Lambs usually learn their heft from their mothers. Also known as 'Hoofing' in some areas like North Yorkshire.
- Hogget, hogg or hog – a young sheep of either sex from about 9 to 18 months of age (until it cuts two permanent teeth); a yearling sheep, as yet unshorn. Also the meat of a hogget. Also teg, old-season lamb, shearling.
- Hoof-shears – implement similar to secateurs, used to trim the hooves of sheep.
- Huntaway – a type of sheepdog (qv) which uses barking as a primary technique to herd sheep. Named for a New Zealand breed of dog. See also eye dog.
- In lamb – pregnant.
- Joining – the placing of rams with ewes for mating (see tupping).
- Ked, or sheep ked – Melophagus ovinus, a species of louse-fly, a nearly flightless biting fly infesting sheep.
- Kemp – a short, white, hollow, hairy fibre usually found about the head and legs of sheep.
- Killer – a sheep that has been selected for slaughter on an Australian property. Also see cull ewe.

=== L–N ===
- Lamb /ˈlæm/ – a young sheep in its first year. In many eastern countries there is a looser use of the term which may include hoggets. Also the meat of younger sheep.
- Lambing – the process of giving birth in sheep. Also the work of tending lambing ewes (shepherds are said to lamb their flocks).
- Lambing jug or lambing pen – a small pen to confine ewes and newly born lambs.
- Lamb marking – the work of earmarking, docking and castration of lambs.
- Lambing percentage – the number of lambs successfully reared in a flock compared with the number of ewes that have been mated – effectively a measure of the success of lambing and the number of multiple births. May vary from around 100% in a hardy mountain flock (where a ewe may not be able to rear more than one lamb safely), to 150% or more in a well-fed lowland flock (whose ewes can more easily support twins or even triplets).
- Lamb's fry – lamb's liver served as a culinary dish.
- Lamb fries – lamb testicles when served as a culinary dish.
- Lanolin – a thick yellow greasy substance in wool, secreted by the sheep's skin. Also called wool fat, wool wax, wool grease, adeps lanae or yolk. Extracted from raw wool and used for various purposes.
- Livestock guardian dog – a dog bred and trained to guard sheep from predators such as bears, wolves, people or other dogs. Usually a large type of dog, often white and woolly, apparently to allow them to blend in with the sheep. Sometimes given a spiked collar to prevent attack by wolves or dogs. Does not usually muster the sheep. Sometimes called a sheepdog – but also see separate entry for this.
- Lug mark – local term in Cumbria for earmark.

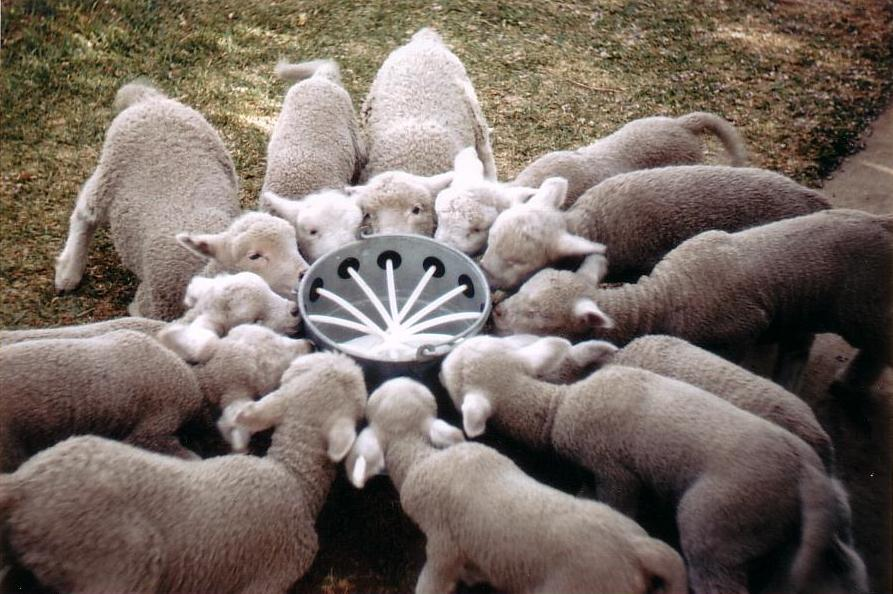
Poddy lambs (orphaned lambs) drinking milk on a sheep station in rural Australia

- Marking knife – a knife with a clamp or hook made for lamb marking.
- Myiasis – see fly strike.
- Micron – one millionth of a metre, a measure of fibre diameter of wool in wool measurement. Term used in preference to "micrometre", the SI name for the same unit.
- Mob – a group or cohort of sheep of the same breed that have run together under similar environmental conditions since the previous shearing (in Australian Wool Classing).
- Monorchid – a male mammal with only one descended testicle, the other being retained internally. Monorchid sheep are less fertile than full rams, but have leaner meat than wethers.
- Mule – a type of cross-bred sheep, both hardy and suitable for meat (especially in northern England). Usually bred from a Bluefaced Leicester ram on hardy mountain ewes such as Swaledales. May be qualified according to the female parent: for example a Welsh Mule is from a Blue-faced Leicester ram and a Welsh Mountain ewe.
- Mulesing – a practice in Australia of cutting off wrinkles from the crutch area of Merinos, to prevent fly strike. Controversial, and illegal in some parts of the world. Named after a Mr Mules.
- Mustering – the round up of livestock for inspection or other purposes.
- Mutton – the meat of an older ewe or wether. May also refer to goat meat in eastern countries. Derived from the Anglo-Norman French word mouton ("sheep").
- NSM – not station mated. A term used in sale advertisements indicating that those ewes have not been mated.

=== O–R ===
- Off shears – sheep have been recently shorn.
- Old-season lamb – a lamb a year old or more. Also hogget, shearling, teg.
- Orf, scabby mouth or contagious ecthyma – a highly contagious viral disease of sheep (and goats) attacking damaged skin areas around the mouth and causing sores, usually affecting lambs in their first year of life.
- Plain bodied – a sheep that has relatively few body wrinkles.
- Poddy lamb, bottle lamb or pet lamb – an orphan lamb reared on a bottle. Also cade lamb, or placer.
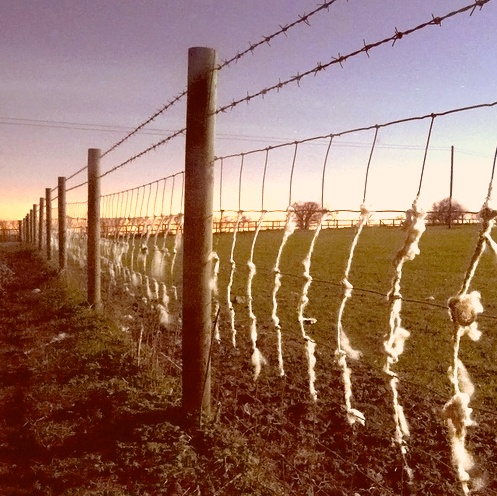
  Rubbed wool indicating the presence of external parasites on sheep.
- Pour-on – see backliner.
- Raddle – coloured pigment used to mark sheep for various reasons, such as to show ownership, or to show which lambs belong to which ewe. May be strapped to the chest of a ram, to mark the backs of ewes he mates (different rams may be given different colours). Also a verb ("that ewe's been raddled"). Also ruddy.
- Ram – an uncastrated adult male sheep. Also tup.
- Riggwelter – a sheep that has fallen onto its back and is unable to get up (usually because of the weight of its fleece).
- Ring – a mob of sheep moving around in a circle.
- Ringer – the top shearer in a shearing gang.
- Ringing – the removal of a circle of wool from around the pizzle of a male sheep.
- Rise – new growth of wool in spring beneath the previous year's fleece. Shearing is easier through this layer.
- Rooing – removing the fleece by hand-plucking. Done once a year in late spring, when the fleece begins to moult naturally, especially in some breeds, such as Shetlands.
- Rouseabout – (often abbreviated to 'rousie'), shedhands who pick up fleeces after they have been removed during shearing. See also broomie above.
- Ruddy – local Cumbrian term for raddle.
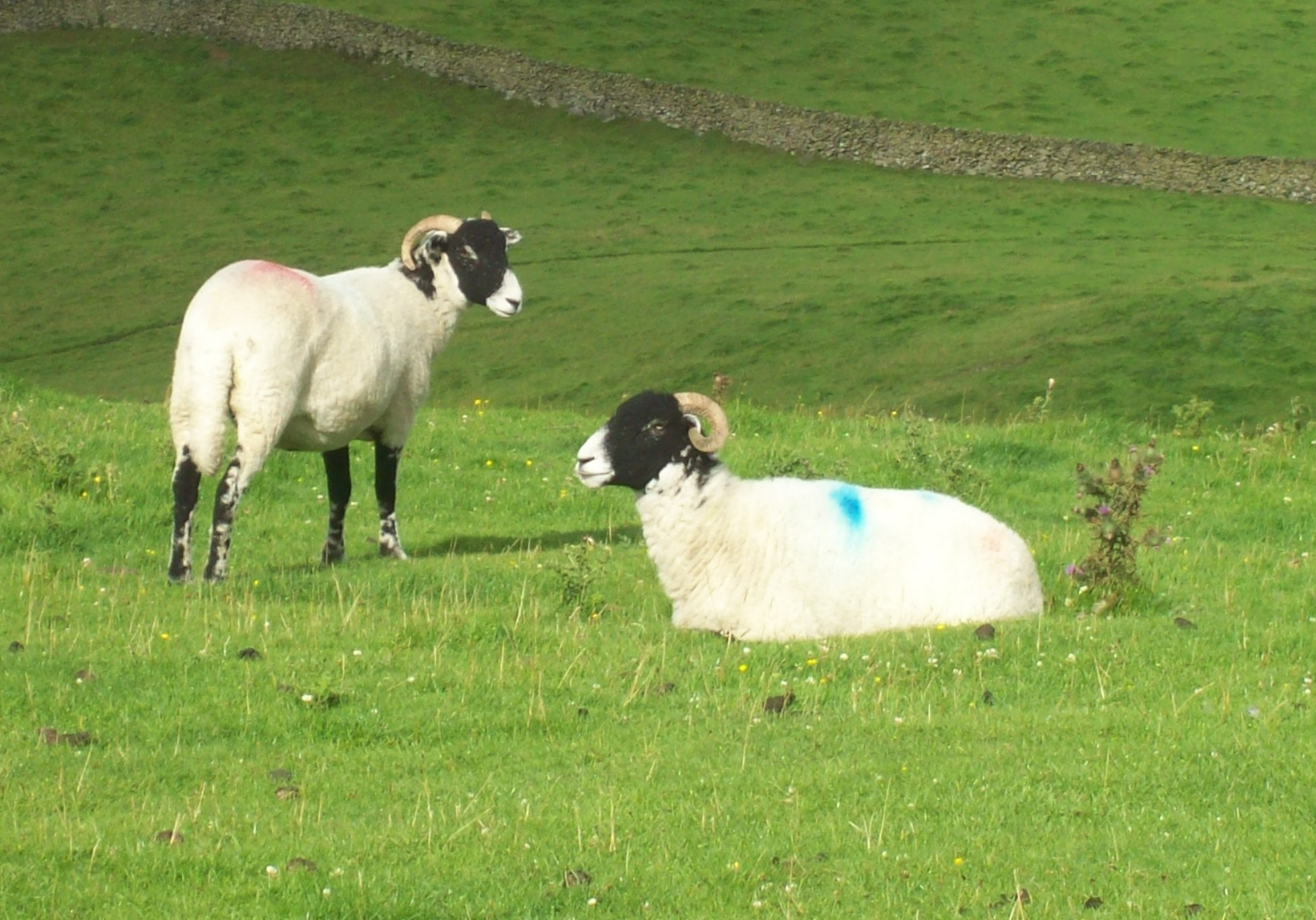
  These sheep have been "raddled" (marked).

=== S ===
- Scab or sheep scab – a type of mange in sheep, a skin disease caused by attack by the sheep scab mite Psoroptes ovis, a psoroptid mite.
- Scabby mouth – see orf above.
- Scrapie – a wasting disease of sheep and goats, a transmissible spongiform encephalopathy (TSE, like BSE of cattle) and believed to be caused by a prion. Efforts have been made in some countries to breed for sheep genotypes resistant to scrapie.
- Shearing – cutting off the fleece, normally done in two pieces by skilled shearers. A sheep may be said to have been either sheared or shorn, depending on dialect. Also clipping.
- Shearling – a yearling sheep before its first shearing. Also hogget, old-season lamb, teg.
- Sheepdog or shepherd dog – a dog used to move and control sheep, often very highly trained. Other types of dog may be used just to guard sheep (see livestock guarding dog), and these are sometimes also called sheepdogs. See also eye dog and huntaway.
- Sheep – the species, or members of it. The plural is the same as the singular, and it can also be used as a mass noun. Normally used of individuals of any age, but in some areas only for those of breeding age.
- Sheepwalk – an area of rough grazing occupied by a particular flock or forming part of a particular farm.
- Shepherd – a stockperson or farmer who looks after sheep while they are in the pasture.
- Shepherding – the act of shepherding sheep, or sheep husbandry more generally.
- Shornie – a freshly shorn sheep.
- Shepherd's crook – a staff with a hook at one end, used to catch sheep by the neck or leg (depending on type).
- SIL – Scanned In Lamb
- Slink – a very young lamb.

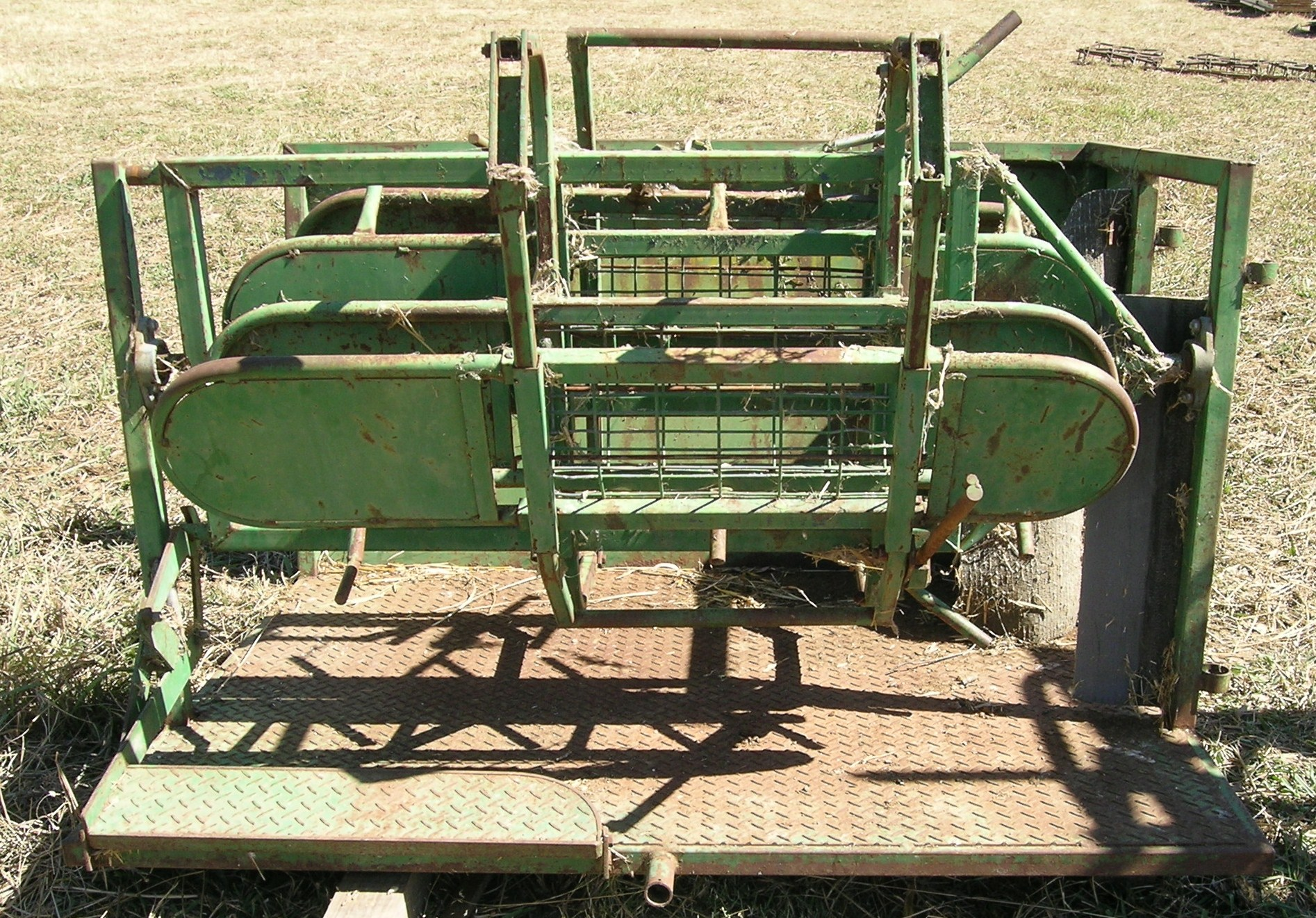
Rollover sheep handler for crutching, foot inspection and paring, general husbandry, udder inspection etc.

- Springer - a ewe close to lambing.
- Stag – a ram castrated after about 6 months of age.
- Staple – a group of wool fibres that formed a cluster or lock.
- Store – a sheep (or other meat animal) in good average condition, but not fat. Usually bought by dealers to fatten for resale.
- Sucker – an unweaned lamb.

=== T–Z ===
- Teg – a sheep in its second year. Also hogget, old-season lamb, shearling.
- Theave or theaf (plural of either: theaves) – a young female sheep, usually before her first lamb (used especially in lowland England). Also gimmer.
- Top knot – wool from the forehead or poll of a sheep.
- Tup – an alternative term for ram.
- Tupping – mating in sheep, or the mating season (autumn, for a spring-lambing flock).
- Twinter – a sheep (or ox/horse) that has lived through two winters.
- Twotooth – South England/Cornish word for an old sheep (Pronounced Twotuth) – usually an old animal with only the two front teeth left.
- Weaner – a young animal that has been weaned, from its mother, until it is about a year old.
- Wether – a castrated male sheep (or goat).
- Wigging – the removal of wool from around a sheep's eyes to prevent wool-blindness.
- Wool-blindness – when excessive wool growth interferes with the normal sight of a sheep.
- Woolcock – a husband of sheep
- Wool-grease – see lanolin.
- Wool pack – a standard-sized woven nylon container manufactured to industry specifications for the transportation of wool.
- Woolsack – a ceremonial cushion used by the Lord Speaker of the UK House of Lords, filled with wool to symbolise the importance of the wool trade for the prosperity of the country.
- Yoke – two crossed pieces of timber or a forked branch fixed to the neck of a habitually straying sheep in an attempt to prevent it breaking through hedges and fences.
- Yolk /ˈjoʊk/ – see lanolin.
- Yow /ˈjaʊ/ – local form of ewe in some areas, Cornish farmers use Yow.

== See also ==
- Domestic sheep
- Sheep husbandry
- Yan Tan Tethera (numbers for counting sheep)
