= Jolt =

Jolt may refer to:

- Jolt, a canine actor, playing Lucky the Pizza Dog in Hawkeye
- Jolt, a DC Comics character, and member of The Blasters
- Jolt Award, an award in the software industry
- Jolt Cola, a soft drink
- Jolt gum, a caffeinated chewing gum from the makers of Jolt Cola
- Jolt Online Gaming, a game server host, game network and broadband internet service provider
- Jolt (comics), a teen heroine from Marvel Comics
- Jolt (film), American action comedy film starring Kate Beckinsale
- Jolt (physics), jerk, or surge, in physics, the third derivative of position with regard to time
- Jolt (Transformers), several robot supervillain and robot superhero characters from the Transformers robot superhero franchise
- The Jolt, Scottish band
- The JOLT, condensed name and acronym for online newspaper, The Journal of Olympia, Lacey & Tumwater

As an acronym

- Harvard Journal of Law & Technology
- North Carolina Journal of Law & Technology
- Journal of Open Law, Technology and Society
- Job Openings and Labor Turnover Survey, a component of the United States Bureau of Labor Statistics

== See also ==
- The Jolts, Canadian punk rock group
