= Gummer =

Gummer is a surname. Notable people with the surname include:

- Alexandra Gummer (born 1992), Australian soccer player
- Ben Gummer (born 1978), British Conservative Party politician
- Don Gummer (born 1946), American sculptor.
- George Gummer, Welsh rugby league footballer
- Grace Gummer (born 1986), American actress
- Jason Gummer (born 1967), Welsh footballer
- John Gummer, Baron Deben (born 1939), British Conservative Party politician
- Mamie Gummer (born 1983), American actress
- Peter Gummer, Baron Chadlington (born 1942), British businessman
- Scott Gummer, American writer and editor
- Tom Gummer (1894 – 1982), British boxer

== See also ==
- Gummer, subdivision of the municipality of Karneid, South Tyrol, Italy
- Gummer and Ford, architectural firm founded in 1923 in Auckland, New Zealand
- Gummer's How, hill in the southern part of the Lake District, England
