= Piana (surname) =

Piana is an Italian surname that may refer to

- Carlo Piana (born 1968), Italian lawyer
- Dino Piana (1930–2023), Italian jazz musician
- Gina La Piana (born 1978), Latina actress and pop singer
- Giovanni Piana (1940–2019), Italian philosopher
- Giuseppe Ferdinando Piana (1864–1956), Italian painter
- Joseph La Piana (born 1966), American artist
- Marlin Piana (born 1982), Congolese footballer
- Remo Piana (1908–1943), Italian basketball player
- Rich Piana (1970–2017), American bodybuilder and businessman

== See also ==
- Loro Piana (surname)
