= Pietro Loro Piana =

Italian engineer and businessman (1883–1941)

Pietro Antonio Loro Piana (Trivero, 6 September 1883 – 1941) was an Italian engineer and entrepreneur. He founded the textile company Loro Piana.

== Biography ==
Pietro Antonio Loro Piana was the son of Giacomo Loro Piana and Clementina Zignone. His family had been in wool-making in the Province of Biella. In Quarona, Province of Vercelli, he founded the Lanificio Fratelli Lora e Compagnia and then Lanificio di Quarona di Zignone & C..

He then started a new venture, Ing. Loro Piana & C. in Corso Rolandi on 24 April 1924. It later became the Loro Piana SpA, one of the largest companies in the world producing clothing in cashmere wool.

Petro Loro Piana died in 1941.
