= Tibetan fur =

White Wool of Tibetan Lamb

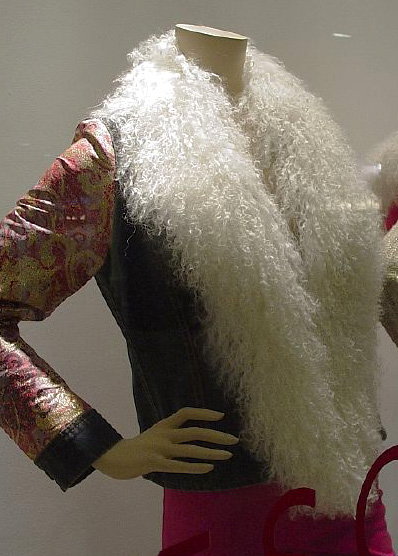
Tibetan lamb fur collar

Tibetan fur refers to the white wool of the Tibetan lamb. Its origin is not really from Tibet, but from the Chinese provinces Shaanxi, Shanxi and Hebei. The wool is soft and around 5 in (12 cm) long, and has a slight waviness to it, being the only curly long-haired fur, making it popular for doll's hair.
