= Carlo Piana =

Italian lawyer and free software advocate

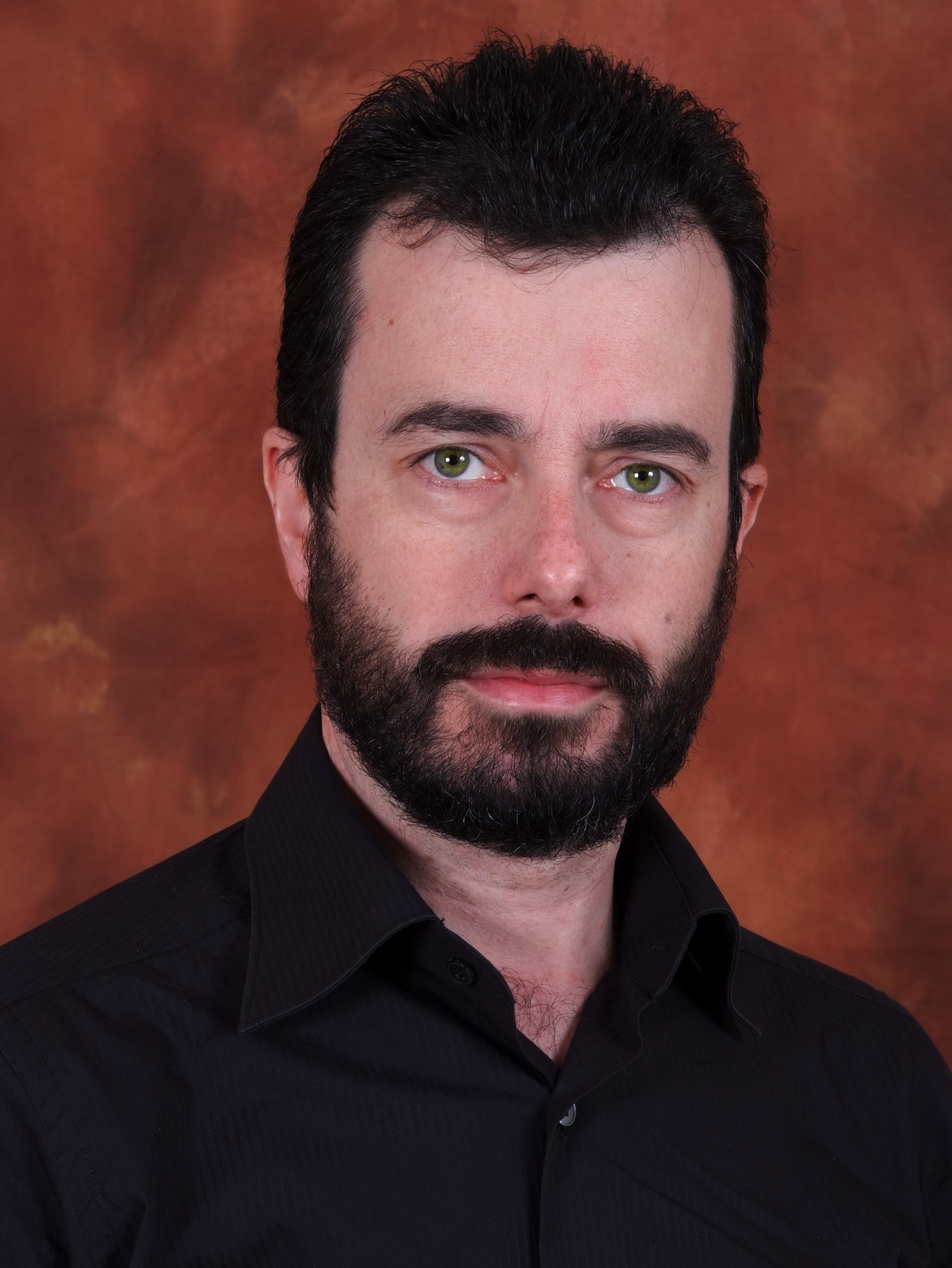
- Born: 25 September 1968 (age 57); Omegna (VB), Italy
- Occupations: Lawyer, free software advocate
- Known for: Free software advocacy, antitrust activities, open standards

Carlo Piana is a lawyer by training and a free software advocate. A qualified attorney in Italy, Piana has been practising IT law since 1995, focusing his practice on software, technology, standardization, data protection and digital liberties in general, and served as external general counsel to the Free Software Foundation Europe ("FSFE").

Piana has been involved in some of the cornerstone legal cases in Europe, such as the long-running antitrust battle between the EU Commission and Microsoft, where he represents both the FSFE and the Samba Team, the standardization of OOXML at ISO/IEC, and more recently defending Oracle in its attempted acquisition of Sun Microsystems.

Piana is a member of the Editorial Committee of the International Free and Open Source Software Law Review ("IFOSS L. rev.") and has been a member of the board of the Open Source Initiative since 2022.

In 2008, he established a freelance consulting practice on IT law, where he leads a small group of IT lawyers named Array.
