= Wool =

Textile fiber from the hair of sheep or other mammals

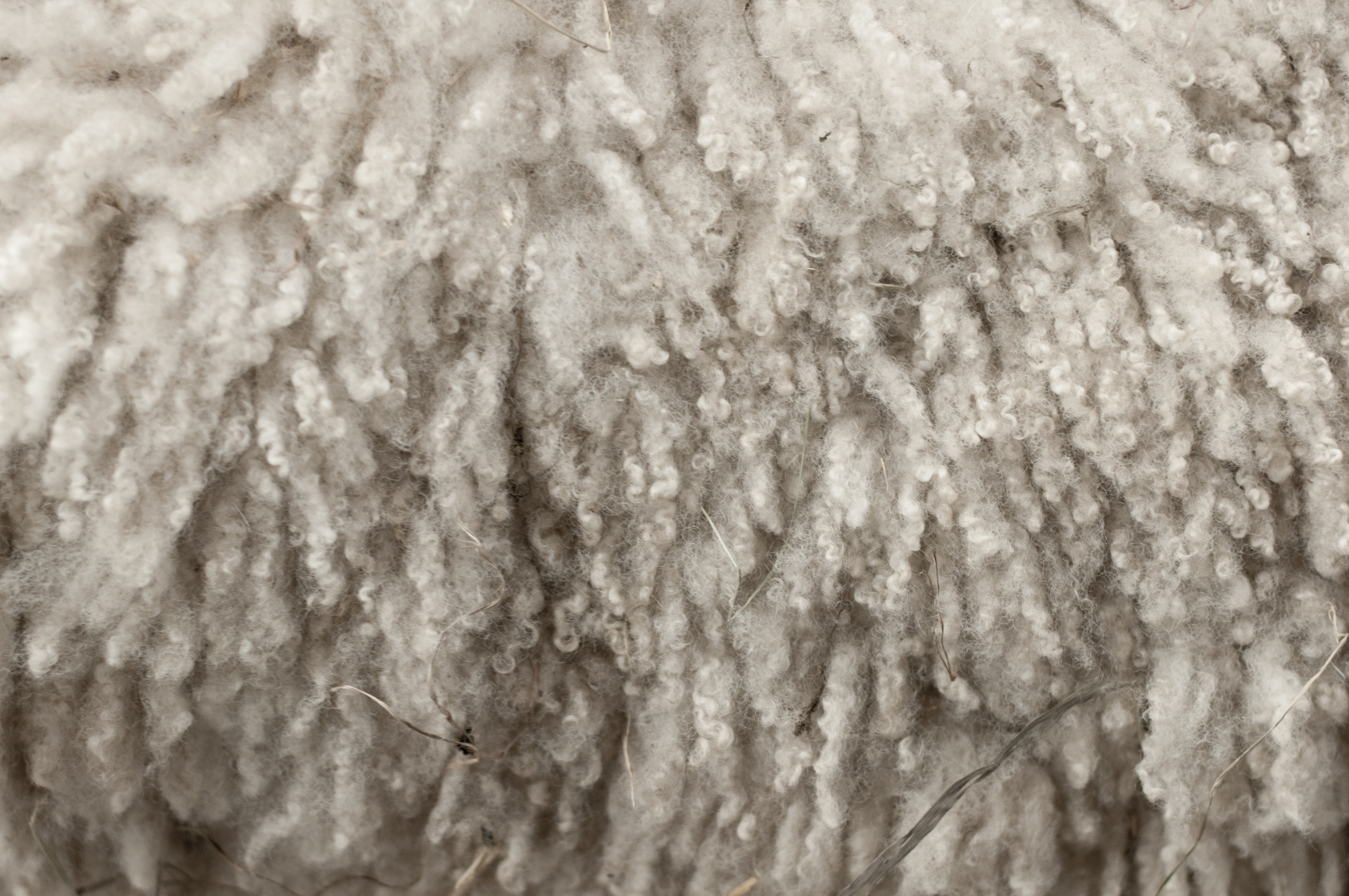
Wool before processing

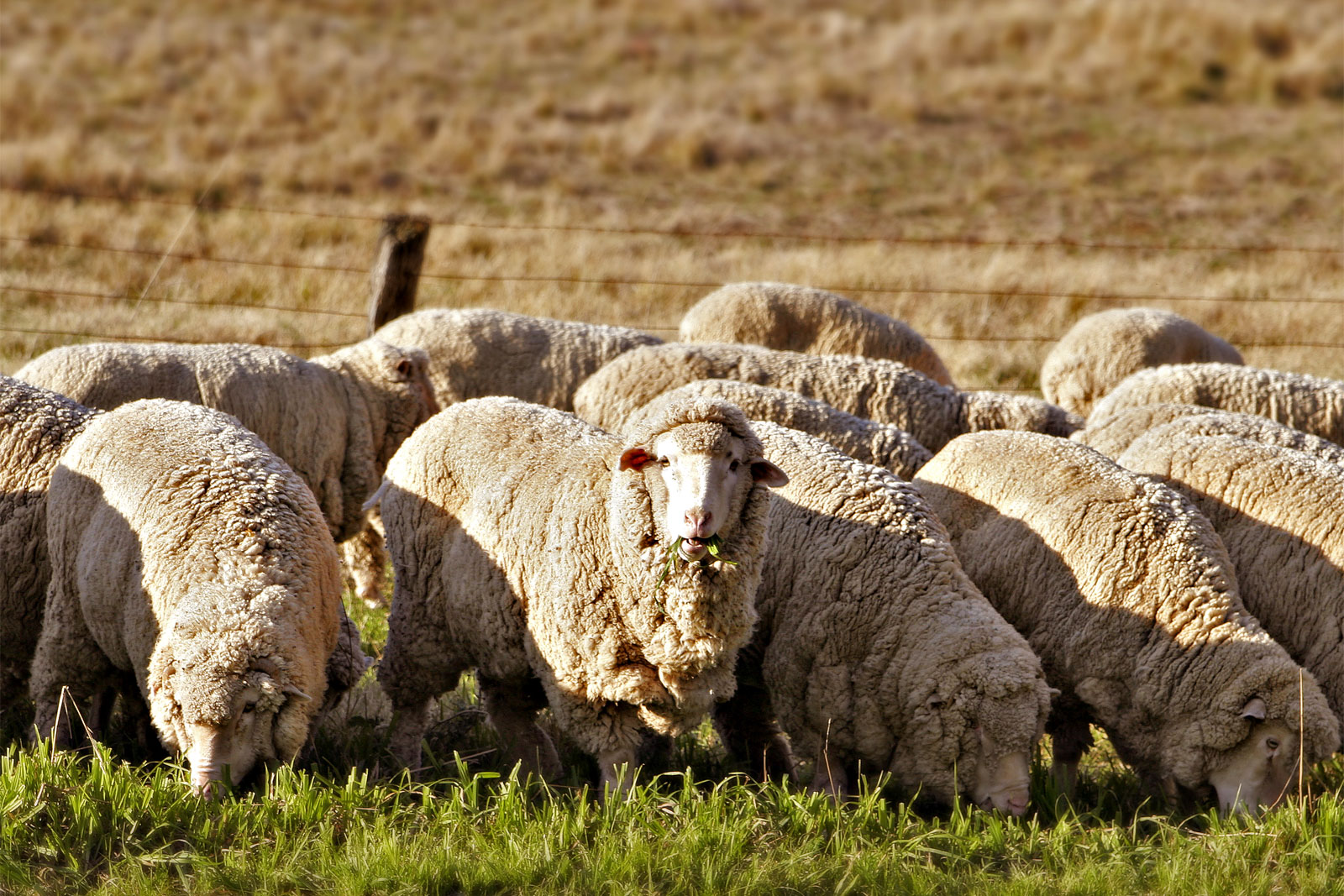
Unshorn Merino sheep. This breed of sheep is known for its fine wool.

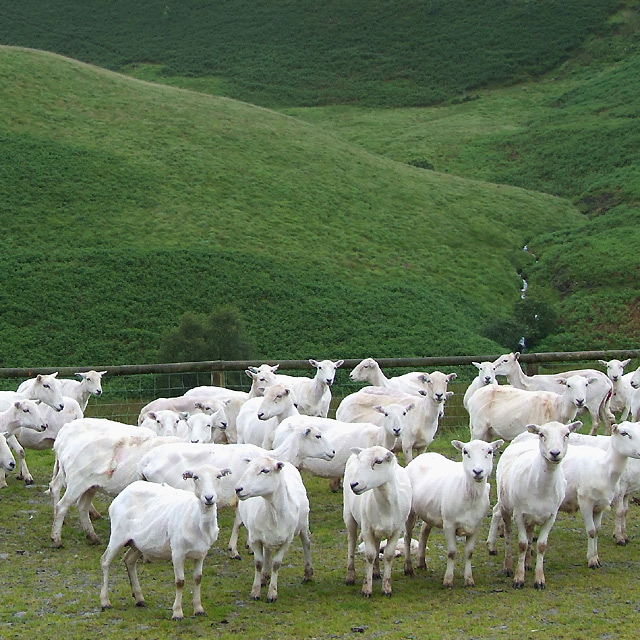
Shorn sheep

Wool is the textile fiber obtained from sheep and other mammals, especially goats, rabbits, and camelids.

Wool is an animal fiber and consists of protein together with a small percentage of lipids. This makes it chemically quite distinct from cotton and other plant fibers, which are mainly cellulose, and akin to silk, another animal fiber composed primarily of protein.

Sheep were domesticated 9,000 to 11,000 years ago, but early sheep were hairy rather than woolly. Woolly breeds appear to have been developed from about 6000 BC, and the earliest known woven wool garments are a few thousand years younger. People in the Andes were using wool from camelids by about 5000 BC. In medieval Europe, wool was a major trade good. In the 13th century it was the main driver of the economies of the Low Countries and central Italy, and it stayed central to England's economy. The Industrial Revolution brought mass production, and Australia became a major exporter in the 19th century. Since the mid-20th century, demand has fallen as synthetic fibres have spread, and production is now much lower than in the past.

Most wool used by the textile industry comes from sheep. Wool is also obtained from goats, camelids, rabbits, and several other mammals, although the names used for these fibres vary between industries and legal systems. After collection, wool is sorted and cleaned before it is carded or combed and made into yarn, felt, insulation, fertilizer, or other products.

== Characteristics ==
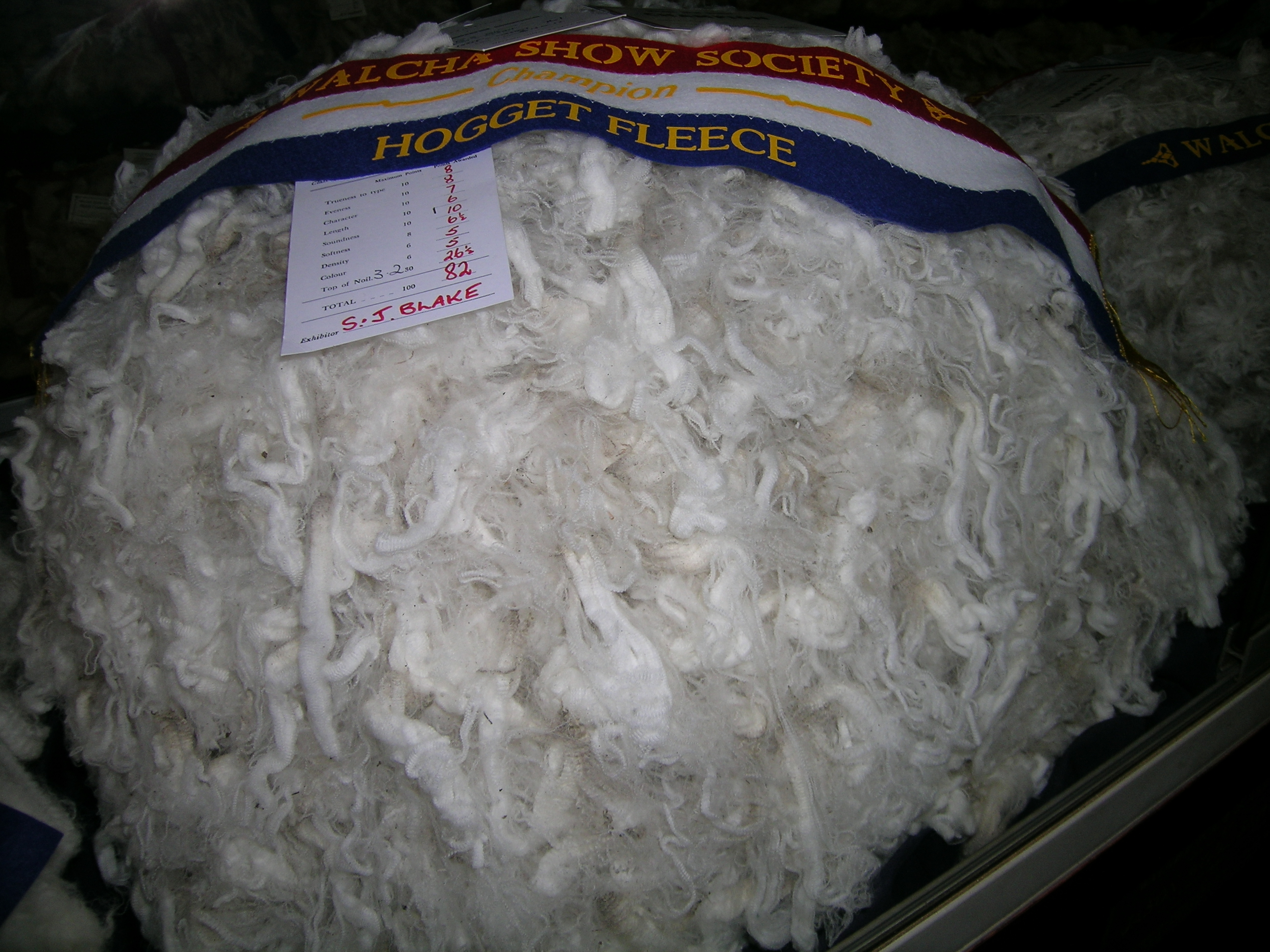
Champion hogget fleece, Walcha Show

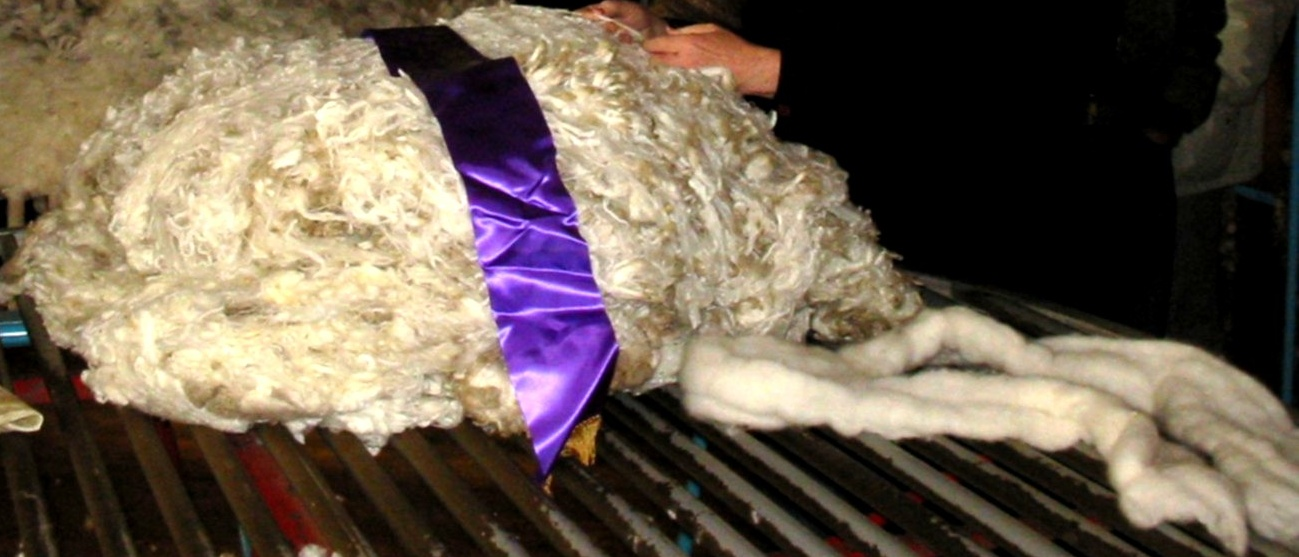
Fleece of fine New Zealand Merino wool and combed wool top on a wool table

Wool is most commonly obtained from sheep. It is generally creamy white, although some breeds produce black, brown, grey, or mixed-colour fleeces. Wool grows from hair follicles, which are structures extending from the epidermis into the dermis. Primary follicles can produce kemp, medullated fibres, and true wool fibres, while secondary follicles produce true wool fibres. Kemp is coarse, usually medullated, and may be shed from the fleece. True wool is distinguished from most hair by its crimp and elasticity.

=== Composition and structure ===
Wool consists mainly of keratin, with about 2–3% lipid material. Keratin is a structural protein also found in human hair and nails. A single wool fiber consists of the cuticle, the cortex, and the medulla. Its keratin contains more sulfur than the fibroin of silk because it is rich in cystine. Disulfide bonds between cystine residues help stabilize the fibre and can be altered by heat or chemical treatment. A fibre has an outer cuticle of overlapping scales and an inner cortex. Coarse fibres may also contain a medulla. The arrangement of different cortical cells contributes to crimp, while the scales contribute to felting.

Wool is usually approximately circular in cross-section. Fibre diameter, staple length, crimp, strength, and colour vary by breed, age, nutrition, and position on the animal. The appearance of a bundle of wool depends on more than just the diameter of its fibres: their number, alignment, colour, crimp, and degree of compression all matter too. Early optical grading was therefore better suited to comparing similarly prepared samples than to absolute measurement. Wet wool is generally weaker than dry wool, unlike many plant fibres. Published values describe particular wool types and test conditions rather than a universal range.

=== Crimp ===
Crimp refers to the strong natural wave present in each wool fiber. Wool's crimp, and to a lesser degree scales, make it easier to spin the fleece by helping the individual fibers attach, so they stay together. Because of the crimp, wool fabrics have greater bulk than other textiles, and they hold air, which causes the fabric to retain heat. The amount of crimp corresponds to the fineness of the wool fibers. A fine wool like Merino may have up to 40 crimps per centimetre (100 crimps per inch), while coarser wool like karakul may have less than one (one or two crimps per inch). In contrast, hair has little if any scale and no crimp, and little ability to bind into yarn. The relative amounts of kemp to wool vary from breed to breed and make some fleeces more desirable for spinning, felting, or carding into batts for quilts or other insulating products.

=== Felting ===
The felting of wool occurs upon hammering or other mechanical agitation as the microscopic barbs on the surface of wool fibers hook together. Felting generally falls under two main areas, dry felting and wet felting. Wet felting occurs when water and a lubricant (especially an alkali such as soap) are applied to the wool which is then agitated until the fibers mix and bond together. Temperature shock while damp or wet accentuates the felting process. Some natural felting can occur on the animal's back.

=== Absorption ===
Wool fibers readily absorb moisture, but are not hollow. Wool can absorb almost one-third of its own weight in water. Wool absorbs sound like many other fabrics.

=== Flammability ===
Wool ignites at a higher temperature than cotton and some synthetic fibers. It has a lower rate of flame spread, a lower rate of heat release, a lower heat of combustion, and does not melt or drip; it forms a char that is insulating and self-extinguishing, and it contributes less to toxic gases and smoke than other flooring products when used in carpets. Wool carpets are specified for high safety environments, such as trains and aircraft. Wool is usually specified for garments for firefighters, soldiers, and others in occupations where they are exposed to the likelihood of fire.

Current evidence does not identify wool fibre itself as a cutaneous allergen. Coarse fibres, especially those at or above about 30–32 micrometres, can cause mechanical irritation and itching. Contact allergy to lanolin or processing chemicals is a separate condition and is uncommon in modern wool garments.

== Processing ==
=== Shearing ===
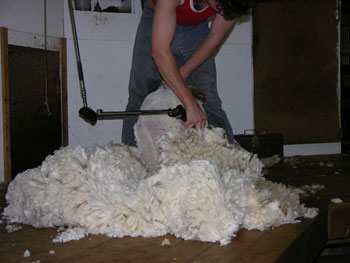
Fine Merino shearing in Lismore, Victoria

Sheep shearing is the process in which a worker (a shearer) cuts off the woollen fleece of a sheep. The quality of fleeces is determined by a technique known as wool classing, whereby a qualified person, called a wool classer, groups wools of similar grading together to maximize the return for the farmer or sheep owner. Before instrumental testing became widely available, classing depended on trained comparison of staple length, crimp, handle, colour, cleanliness, and apparent fineness. Classers could work quickly and consistently within a local grading system, but comparing results between stations was harder unless everyone used the same samples or standards. The commercial need for comparability led to both collections of reference wool and experiments with measuring devices. Wool-classers separate the wool into four main categories:

- Fleece (which makes up the vast bulk)
  - Best quality and highest value wool, often the longest and cleanest with the most uniform crimp
- Broken Fleece
  - High quality, but has broken into smaller pieces than the normal fleece
- Bellies
  - From the underside of the sheep, commonly stained and less dense resulting in lower value
- Locks
  - Shortest pieces of fleece, often from a second cut by the shearer, and generally the lowest quality and value

=== Scouring ===
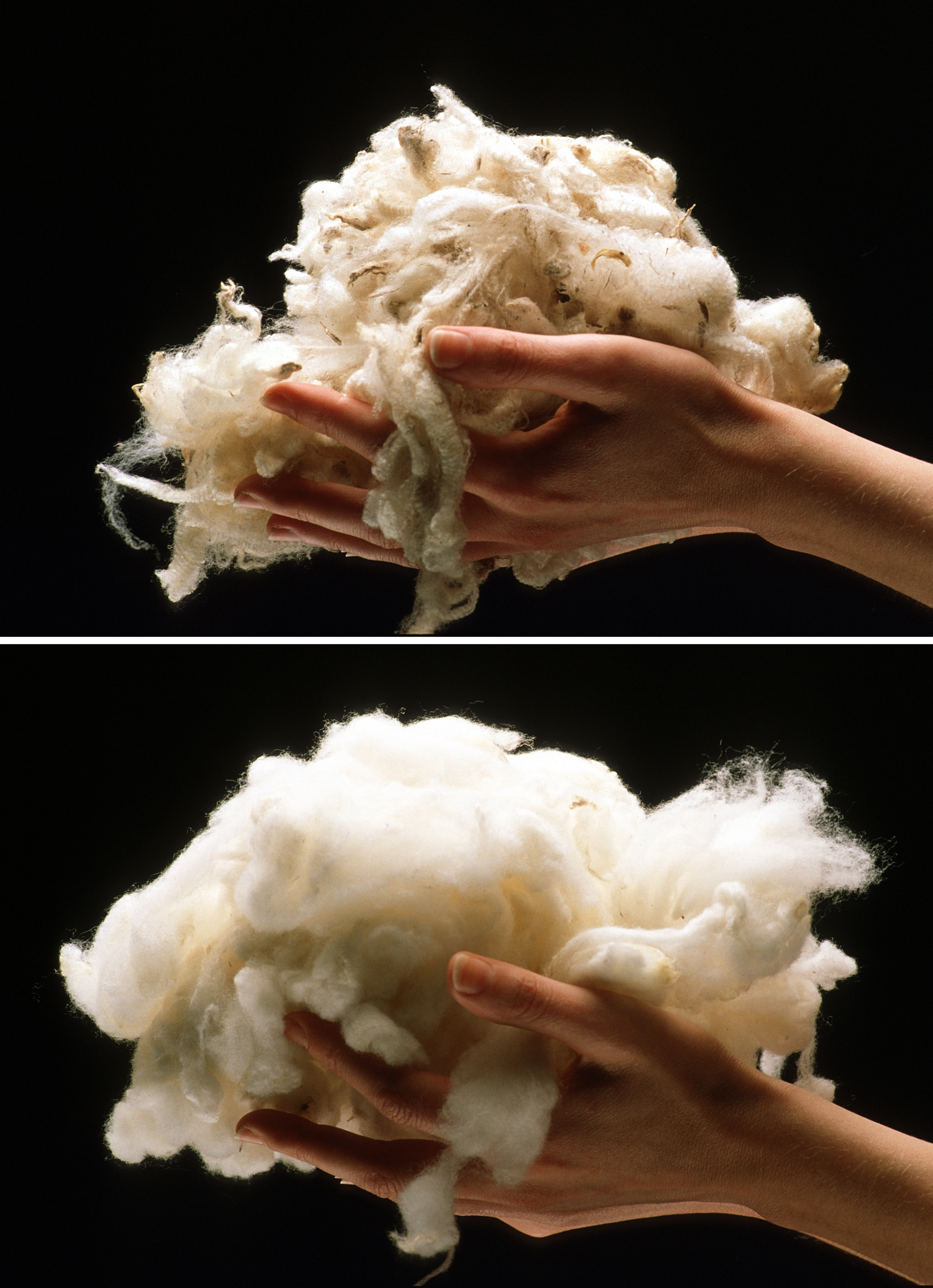
Wool before and after scouring

Wool straight off a sheep is known as "raw wool", "greasy wool" or "wool in the grease". This wool contains a high level of valuable lanolin, as well as the sheep's dead skin and sweat residue, and generally also contains pesticides and vegetable matter from the animal's environment. Before modern disinfection and occupational controls, raw wool could carry Bacillus anthracis spores and transmit the disease historically known as woolsorters' disease. Cuts and puncture wounds from sorting, packing, or baling contaminated fleece could let the bacteria enter through the skin. Before the wool can be used for commercial purposes, it must be scoured, a process of cleaning the greasy wool. Scouring may be as simple as a bath in warm water or as complicated as an industrial process using detergent and alkali in specialized equipment. In north west England, special potash pits were constructed to produce potash used in the manufacture of a soft soap for scouring locally produced white wool.

Vegetable matter in commercial wool is often removed by chemical carbonization. In less-processed wools, vegetable matter may be removed by hand and some of the lanolin left intact through the use of gentler detergents. This semigrease wool can be worked into yarn and knitted into particularly water-resistant mittens or sweaters, such as those of the Aran Island fishermen. Lanolin removed from wool is widely used in cosmetic products such as hand creams.

=== Carding, combing, and finishing ===
After washing, wool is carded and may also be combed. Carded short-staple fibre is used for soft, bulky woollen yarn, while combed long-staple fibre is used for smoother and stronger worsted yarn. Finishing treatments can reduce felting, improve machine washability, protect against insects, or alter handle and appearance. The chlorine-Hercosett process is a common shrink-resist treatment; chlorine-free alternatives have also been developed.

== Fineness and yield ==
Raw wool has many impurities; vegetable matter, sand, dirt and yolk which is a mixture of suint (sweat), grease, urine stains and dung locks. The sheep's body yields many types of wool with differing strengths, thicknesses, length of staple and impurities. The raw wool (greasy) is processed into 'top'. 'Worsted top' requires strong straight and parallel fibres.

Common name	Part of sheep	Style of wool
Fine	Shoulder	Fine, uniform and very dense
Near	Sides	Fine, uniform and strong
Downrights	Neck	Short and irregular, lower quality
Choice	Back	Shorter staple, open and less strong
Abb	Haunches	Longer, stronger staple
Seconds	Belly	Short, tender, matted and dirty
Top-not	Head	Stiff, very coarse, rough and kempy
Brokes	Forelegs	Short, irregular and faulty
Cowtail	Hindlegs	Very strong, coarse and hairy
Britch	Tail	Very coarse, kempy and dirty

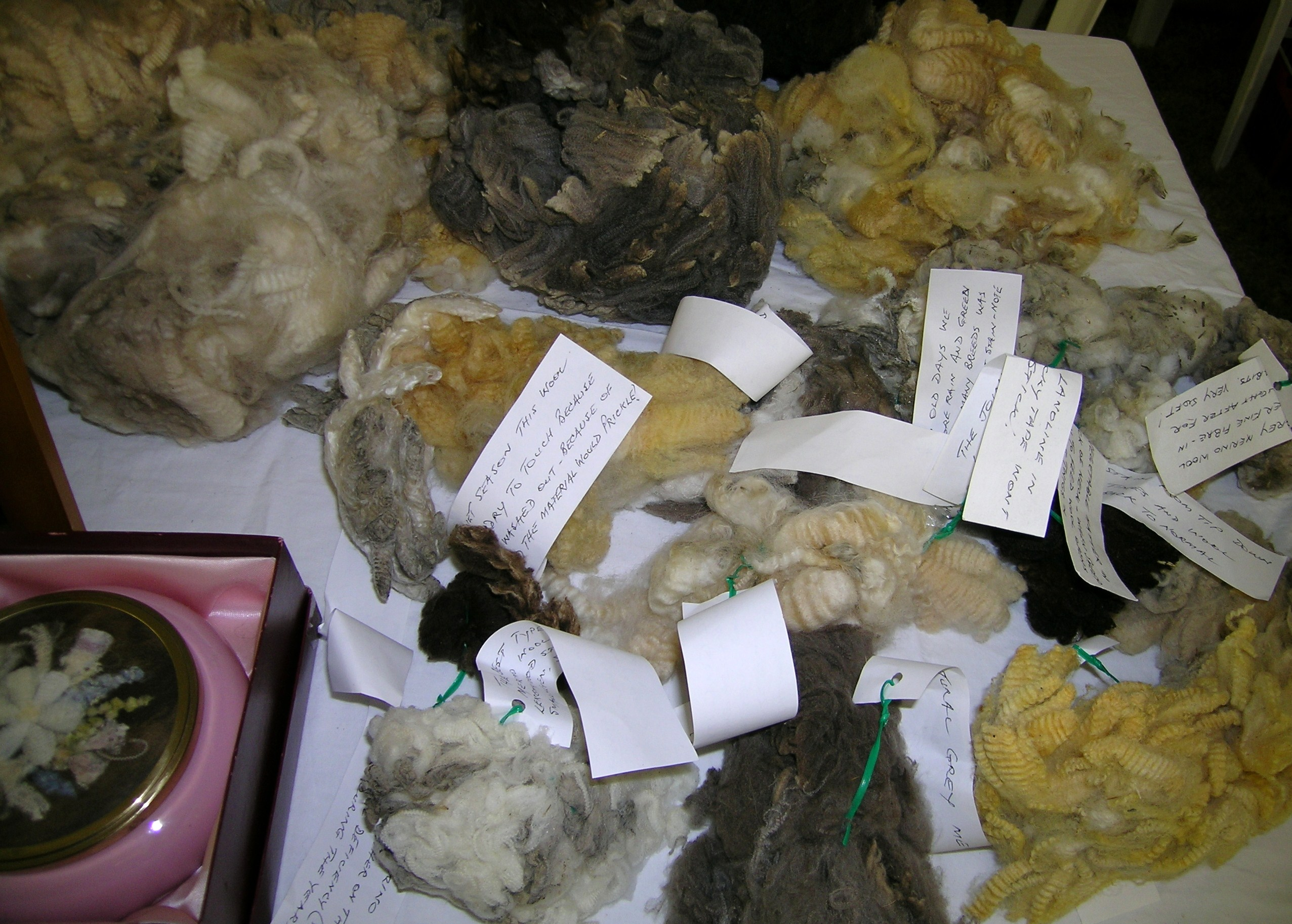
Various types and natural colors of wool, and a picture made from wool

The quality of wool is determined by its fiber diameter, crimp, yield, color, and staple strength. Fiber diameter is the single most important wool characteristic determining quality and price. At the start of the twentieth century, efforts to make fineness assessment more reproducible sometimes relied on properties that could be checked outside a laboratory. At the Icelandic wool-export station of Kolkuós there has been experimentation with combining the resistance of a small fibre sample with an optical comparison of its fineness. Before instrumental testing became common, fineness was assessed by comparing the appearance and handle of prepared samples with reference wools.

The finest and most valuable wool comes from Merino hoggets. Merino wool is typically 90–115 mm (3.5–4.5 in) in length and is very fine.(between 12 and 24 microns). Because of this, Merinos are typically graded separately from other breeds:

Merinos
Diameter in microns	Name
< 15.5	Ultrafine Merino
15.6–18.5	Superfine Merino
18.6–20	Fine Merino
20.1–23	Medium Merino
> 23	Strong Merino

The grades of wool may vary depending on the breed or purpose of the wool. Wool taken from sheep produced for meat, for instance, is typically coarser, and has fibers 40–150 mm (1.5–6 in) in length. Damage or breaks in the wool can occur if the sheep is stressed while it is growing its fleece, resulting in a thin spot where the fleece is likely to break. Different breeds have different average microns, and therefore value:

Breeds
Breeds	Diameter
Comeback	21–26 microns, white, 90–180 mm (3.5–7.1 in) long
Fine crossbred	27–31 microns, Corriedales, etc.
Medium crossbred	32–35 microns
Downs	23–34 microns, typically lacks luster and brightness. Examples, Aussiedown, Dorset Horn, Suffolk, etc.
Coarse crossbred	>36 microns
Carpet wools	35–45 microns

The finest Australian and New Zealand Merino wools are known as 1PP, which is the industry benchmark of excellence for Merino wool 16.9 microns and finer. This style represents the top level of fineness, character, color, and style as determined on the basis of a series of parameters in accordance with the original dictates of British wool as applied by the Australian Wool Exchange (AWEX) Council. Only a few dozen of the millions of bales auctioned every year can be classified and marked 1PP.

In the United States, three classifications of wool are named in the Wool Products Labeling Act of 1939. Wool is "the fiber from the fleece of the sheep or lamb or hair of the Angora or Cashmere goat (and may include the so-called specialty fibers from the hair of the camel, alpaca, llama, and vicuna) which has never been reclaimed from any woven or felted wool product". "Virgin wool" and "new wool" are also used to refer to such never used wool. There are two categories of recycled wool (also called reclaimed or shoddy wool). "Reprocessed wool" identifies "wool which has been woven or felted into a wool product and subsequently reduced to a fibrous state without having been used by the ultimate consumer". "Reused wool" refers to such wool that has been used by the ultimate consumer.

Current United States law groups both pre-consumer and post-consumer fibre returned from a woven, knitted, or felted product under the label "recycled wool". The European Union uses a different legal definition and permits terms equivalent to "virgin wool" or "fleece wool" only when the fibre has not previously been part of a finished product and has not undergone damaging processing.

The Super S system used for fine wool fabrics describes maximum mean fibre diameter, not yarn length per unit mass. For example, Super 100 wool has a mean fibre diameter of 18.75 micrometres or finer, and each increase of ten in the S number lowers the limit by 0.5 micrometre.

Terms based on production method also vary. Fleece wool or virgin wool generally describes new fibre taken from a living animal. Pulled or skin wool is removed from the skins of slaughtered animals, while wool recovered from textile waste is known as recycled, reclaimed, shoddy, or mungo according to its source and processing. Animal-specific names include cashmere, mohair, alpaca, qiviut, vicuña, and yak fibre. These names do not always fall within the legal definition of wool in a particular country.

== Etymology ==
The English word wool is cognate with Dutch wol, German Wolle, Swedish ull, Icelandic ull, Lithuanian vilna, Welsh gwlân, and Latin lāna. These forms are commonly traced to a reconstructed Proto-Indo-European word for wool, conventionally written *h₂wĺ̥h₁-neh₂-. The reconstruction has been used in arguments about the date and location of Proto-Indo-European, although such arguments depend on when woolly sheep and a specialized wool vocabulary developed.

== History ==
=== Before current era ===
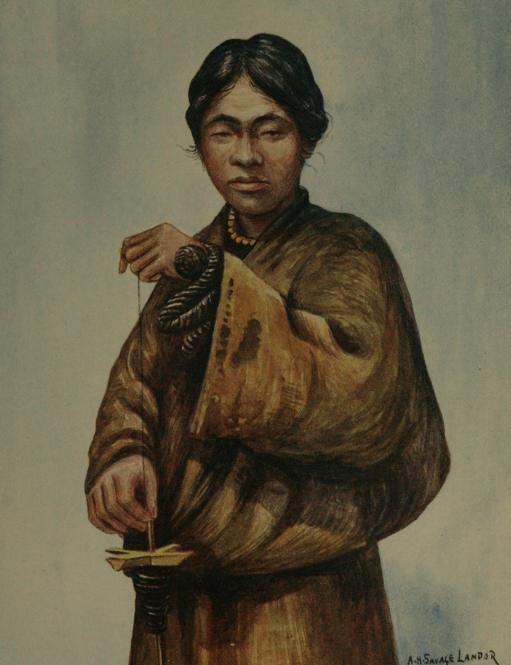
A 1905 illustration of a Tibetan man spinning wool

Wild sheep were more hairy than woolly. Although sheep were domesticated some 9,000 to 11,000 years ago, archaeological evidence from statuary found at sites in Iran suggests selection for woolly sheep may have begun around 6000 BC, with the earliest known woven wool garments having only been dated to two to three thousand years later. Woolly sheep were introduced into Europe from the Near East in the early part of the 4th millennium BC. The oldest known European wool textile, c. 1500 BC, was preserved in a Danish bog. Before the invention of shears—probably in the Iron Age — wool was plucked out by hand or with bronze combs. In Roman times, wool, linen, and leather clothed the European population; cotton from India was a curiosity of which only naturalists had heard, and silks, imported along the Silk Road from China, were extravagant luxury-goods. Pliny the Elder records in his Natural History that the reputation for producing the finest wool was enjoyed by Tarentum, where selective breeding had produced sheep with superior fleeces, but which required special care.

In the central Andes, people used wool from wild and domesticated camelids by about 5000 BC. Woven wool is documented in Peru from about 2500 BC, and dyed wool appears in the Paracas textile tradition by about 800 BC. In North America, the Chilkat Tlingit used mountain-goat wool for woven blankets, while Navajo weavers combined sheep wool with an older cotton tradition. In parts of Central Asia, Mongolia, and China, wool was long used more extensively for felt, carpets, and fleeces than for woven cloth. The history of goat fibres is less well documented; cashmere is combed from the seasonal undercoat, while selective breeding gave the Angora goat a fleece resembling that of wool sheep.

=== 12th and 13th centuries ===
Economies of scale were instituted in the Cistercian houses, which had accumulated great tracts of land during the 12th and early 13th centuries, when land prices were low and labor still scarce. Raw wool was baled and shipped from North Sea ports to the textile cities of Flanders, notably Ypres and Ghent, where it was dyed and worked up as cloth. As trade connections expanded in medieval Europe, the Champagne fairs revolved around the production of wool cloth in small centers such as Provins. The network developed by the annual fairs meant that the woolens of Provins might find their way to Naples, Sicily, Cyprus, Mallorca, Spain, and even Constantinople. The wool trade developed into serious undertaking, a generator of capital, and in the 13th century, the wool trade became the economic engine of the Low Countries and central Italy.

A great deal of the value of woollen textiles was in the dyeing and finishing of the woven product. In each of the centers of the textile trade, the manufacturing process came to be subdivided into a collection of trades, overseen by an entrepreneur in a system called by the English the "putting-out" system, or "cottage industry", and the Verlagssystem by the Germans. In this system of producing wool cloth, once perpetuated in the production of Harris tweeds, the entrepreneur provides the raw materials and an advance, the remainder being paid upon delivery of the product. Written contracts bound the artisans to specified terms. Fernand Braudel traces the appearance of the system in the 13th-century economic boom, quoting a document of 1275. The system effectively bypassed the guilds' restrictions. In the same year, 1275, the English crown had imposed an export tax on wool called the "Great Custom".

=== 14th and 15th centuries ===
During the 14th century, wool continued to play a central role in the English economy, and this can be seen in the fact that since then, the presiding officer of the House of Lords has sat on the "Woolsack", a chair stuffed with wool. At the time of the Black Death (1346-1353), English textile industries consumed about 10% of English wool production, and the English textile trade continued to grow during the 15th century, to the point where the export of wool was discouraged.

By the end of the 14th century, Italy predominated in the European wool trade. Before the flowering of the Renaissance, the Medici and other great banking houses of Florence had built their wealth and banking system on their textile industry based on wool, overseen by the Arte della Lana, the wool guild: wool-textile interests guided Florentine policies. The Florentine wool guild, Arte della Lana, sent imported English wool to the San Martino convent for processing, while Italian wool from Abruzzo and Spanish merino wools were processed at Garbo workshops. Abruzzo wool had once been the most accessible for the Florentine guild, until improved relations with merchants in Iberia made merino wool more available. Francesco Datini, the "merchant of Prato", established in 1383 an Arte della Lana for that small Tuscan city. In the 15th century Pisa established a factory "which would export its cloths to the Crimea in exchange for Russian furs". At the same time, the sheepwalks of Castile were controlled by the Mesta union of sheep-owners. They shaped the landscape and the fortunes of the meseta that lies in the heart of the Iberian peninsula.

=== 16th century to modern era ===
In the 16th century, a unified Spain allowed export of merino lambs only with royal permission. Towards the end of this century, Italian wool exports to the Levant had declined, and were eventually replaced by silk production. After the Restoration of 1660, fine English woolens began to compete with silks in the international market, partly aided by the Navigation Acts; in 1699, the English Crown forbade its American colonies to trade wool with anyone but England herself.

==== Calico Acts ====
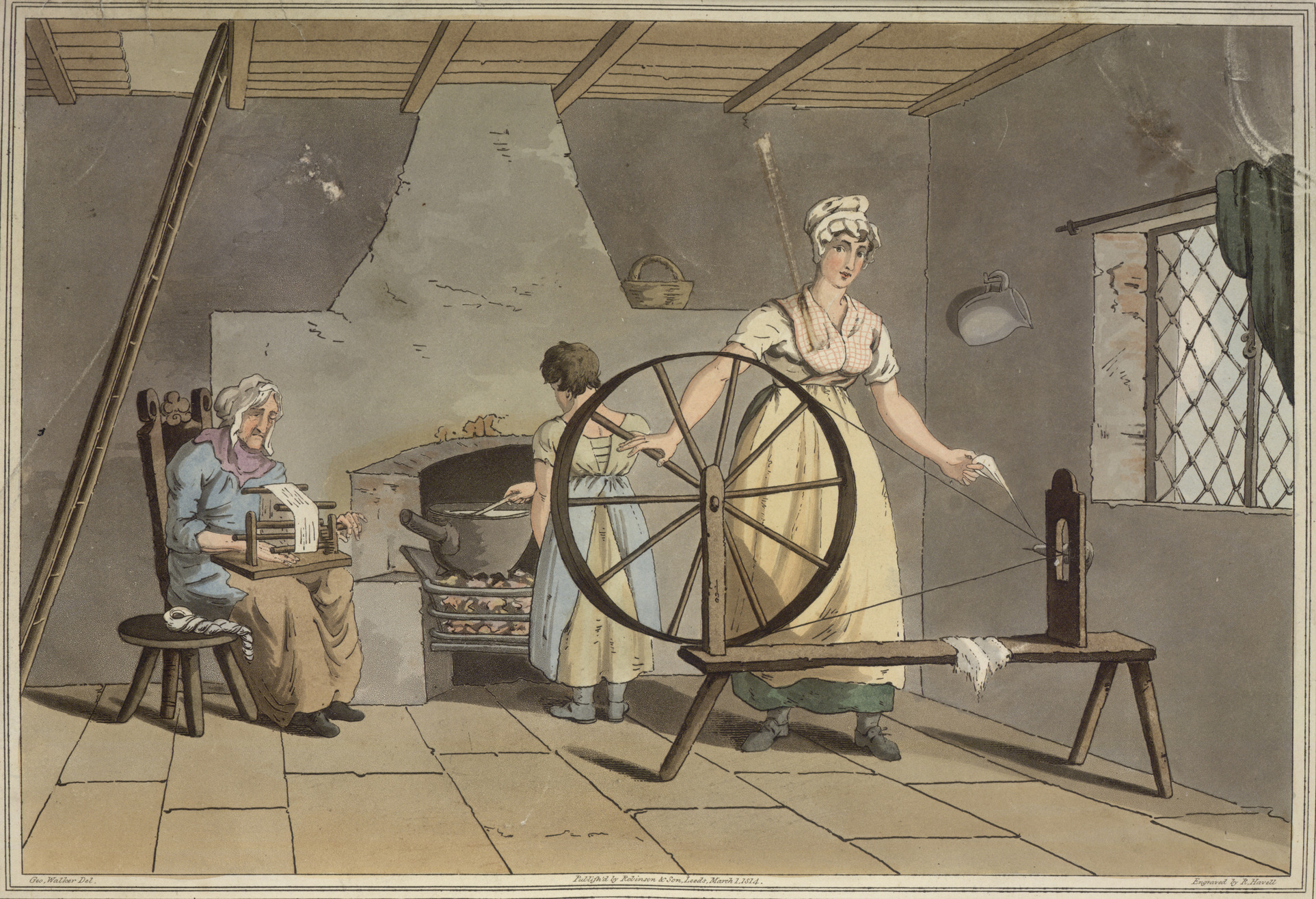
George Walker, 1814

Over the centuries, various British laws controlled the wool trade or required the use of wool even in burials. The smuggling of wool out of the country, known as owling, was at one time punishable by the cutting off of a hand. Later, the Industrial Revolution introduced mass-production technology into wool- and wool-cloth-manufacturing. Australia's colonial economy came to depend on sheep-raising, and the Australian wool trade eventually overtook that of the Germans by 1845, furnishing wool for Bradford, which developed as the heart of industrialized woolens production.

==== 20th century ====
Due to decreasing demand for wool with increased use of synthetic fibers, wool production is much less than what it was in the past. The move toward uniform commercial grades usually came through standardized reference samples rather than new instruments. At Kolkuós, samples supplied through Copenhagen replaced the local “Lichtwaage” in 1912: an administratively simple standard won out over a more elaborate local experiment. The Kolkuós case shows a shift from individual expert judgement toward transferable systems of wool classification. The collapse in the price of wool began in late 1966 with a 40% drop; with occasional interruptions, the price has tended down. The result has been sharply reduced production and the movement of resources into production of other commodities, in the case of sheep growers, to production of meat.

Superwash wool (or washable wool) technology first appeared in the early 1970s, producing wool that has been specially treated so it is machine washable and may be tumble-dried. This wool is produced using an acid bath that removes the "scales" from the fiber, or by coating the fiber with a polymer that prevents the scales from attaching to each other and causing shrinkage. This process results in a fiber that holds longevity and durability better than synthetic materials, while retaining garment shape.

==== 21st century ====
In December 2004, a bale of the then world's finest wool, averaging 11.8 microns, sold for AU$3,000 per kilogram at auction in Melbourne. This fleece wool tested with an average yield of 74.5%, 68 mm (2.7 in) long, and had 40 newtons per kilotex strength. The result was A$279,000 for the bale. In December 2006, the General Assembly of the United Nations proclaimed 2009 to be the International Year of Natural Fibres, so as to raise the profile of wool and of other natural fibers. In 2007, a new wool suit was developed and sold in Japan which can be washed in the shower, and which dries off ready to wear within hours with no ironing required. The suit, developed using Australian merino wool, enables woven products made from wool, such as suits, trousers, and skirts, to be cleaned using a domestic shower. The finest bale of wool ever auctioned was sold for a seasonal record of AU$2690 per kilo during June 2008. This bale was produced by the Hillcreston Pinehill Partnership and measured 11.6 microns, 72.1% yield, and had a 43 newtons per kilotex strength measurement. The bale realized $247,480 and was exported to India.

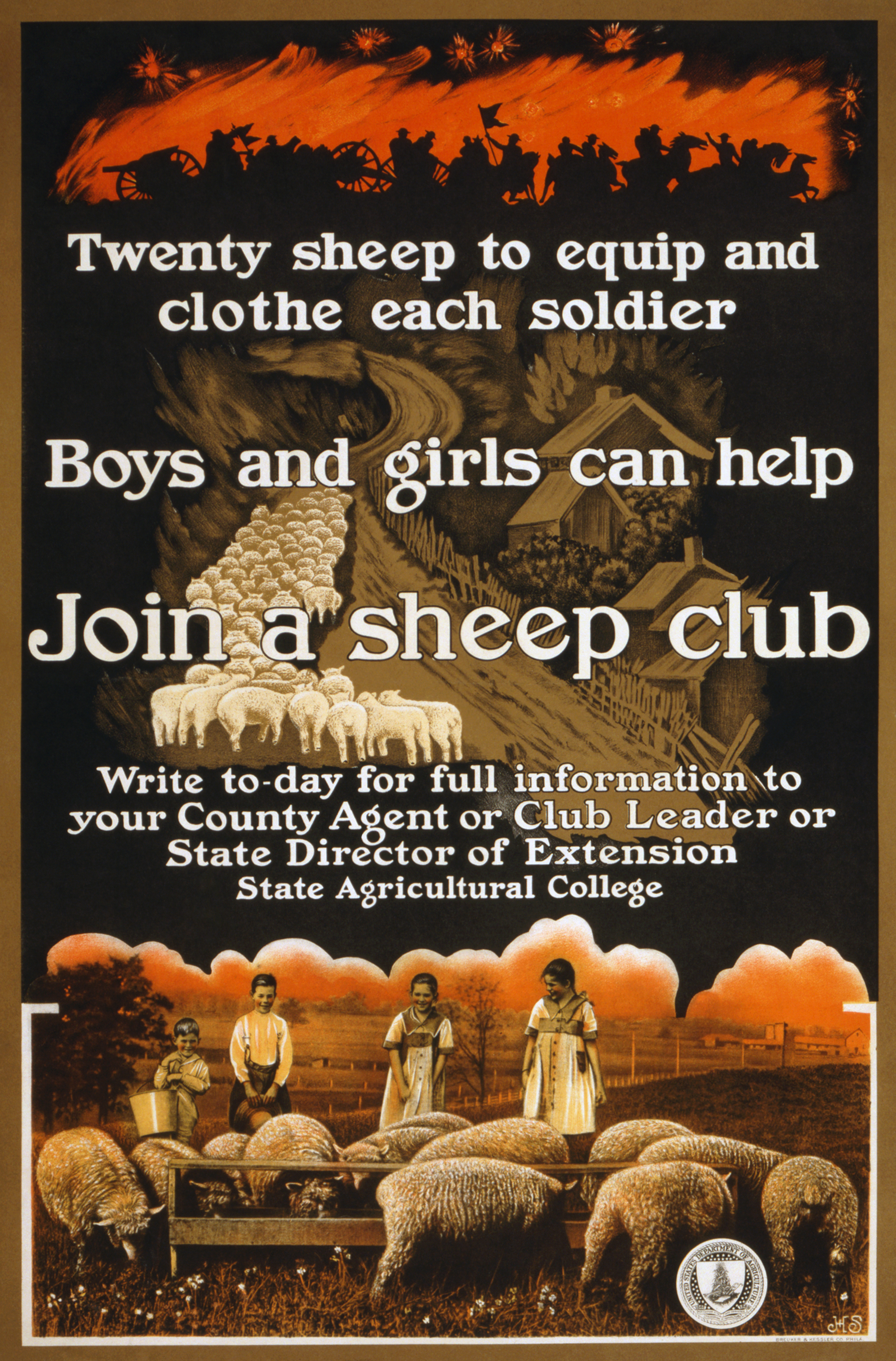
A World War I-era poster sponsored by the United States Department of Agriculture encouraging children to raise sheep to provide needed war supplies

== Icelandic wool ==
The fleece of the Icelandic sheep has a fine, crimped undercoat called þel and a longer, stronger outer coat called tog. Traditional workers separated the two by hand. Þel was teased, carded, and spun first with a spindle and later with a spinning wheel. Yarn could be used as a single strand or plied from two or three strands. Tog was cleaned with special combs when intended for weaving or embroidery. Tog yarn was also used for durable work such as stitching skin shoes, making outer socks and lumpfish nets, coarse bedcovers, sails, tents, and wadmal.

Traditional descriptions divide the fleece hairs into four groups: þel, tog, white kemp, and reddish-yellow kemp. Þel accounts for about 88% of the individual hairs but, because its fibres are short and fine, about half of the fleece weight. Its irregular crimp gives yarn considerable bulk and traps air. Tog is straighter and resembles flax in some traditional uses. Wool varies with the sheep's age and sex: lambswool is the finest, while wool from older rams is usually coarser.

Domestic wool processing normally began after the autumn slaughter season and continued during winter. Until after the Second World War, much Icelandic wool was washed on farms. Urine was collected as an alkaline detergent and mixed with water, commonly in a ratio of one to two. In one method the liquid was warmed to about 40 to 45 °C (104 to 113 °F) and the wool was moved through it without overheating. In another, larger quantities were pressed by foot into a barrel of warm washing liquid and left for one or two hours. The wool was then rinsed in the sea or running water and spread on fields to dry.

After washing, white fleece rich in þel was reserved for underwear. Naturally coloured wool was used for better socks, mittens, shawls, stripes, and decoration; yellowed or tog-rich wool went into coarser outer clothing. Matted and waste wool was used in ropes and girths. Wool washing was largely women's work in rural Iceland. Home washing declined as people moved to towns and factories at Iðunn, Gefjun, and Álafoss installed washing machinery.

The unspun carded strand known as lopi combines tog and þel. It can be knitted directly in two or more strands. The circular-yoked lopapeysa developed during the 1940s and had acquired its familiar form by the late 1950s. Its patterning drew on several imported traditions, particularly Swedish Bohus knitting, as well as Greenlandic and Norwegian designs; no single creator is documented. The sweater became an export product during the 1960s, declined in popularity during the following decade, and returned to prominence in Icelandic fashion after 2003, when shorter and more fitted versions appeared.

Wadmal was Iceland's main early export and also served as a regulated measure of value. Processed wool was still the country's principal export in the seventeenth century. The share exported as raw wool grew during the nineteenth century, when it came to exceed half of Icelandic wool exports. Household production continued into the twentieth century. The introduction of the first wool-processing machine in 1884 began a gradual mechanization, and production shifted substantially to factories around the end of the Second World War.

== Production ==
About 1.98 million tonnes of greasy sheep wool were produced worldwide in 2024. Greasy-wool figures include wool before scouring and are not directly comparable with clean-wool figures. China, Australia, and New Zealand were the three largest producers by greasy weight; Australia supplied a larger share of fine apparel and Merino wool. Breeds such as Lincoln, Romney, Drysdale, and Elliotdale produce coarser fibres commonly used in carpets and other interior textiles.

In the United States, Texas, New Mexico, and Colorado have large commercial sheep flocks, including Rambouillet sheep. Small flocks of specialist breeds also supply the hand-spinning market.

Animal rights groups have noted issues with the production of wool, such as mulesing.

Production of wool

Per capita production of wool

== Marketing ==
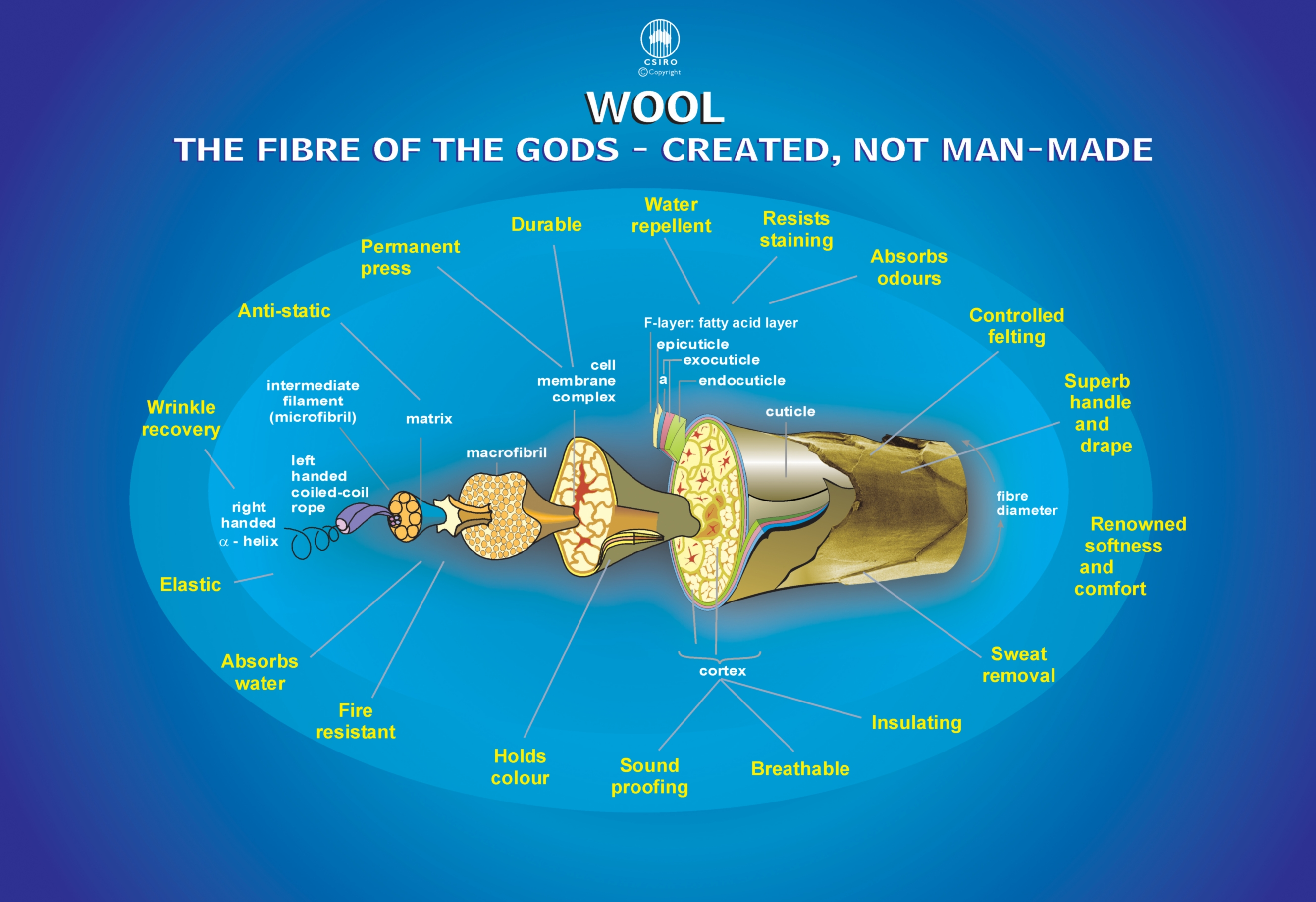
"Wool: Fibre of the gods, created – not man-made" CSIRO marketing poster describing the benefits of wool

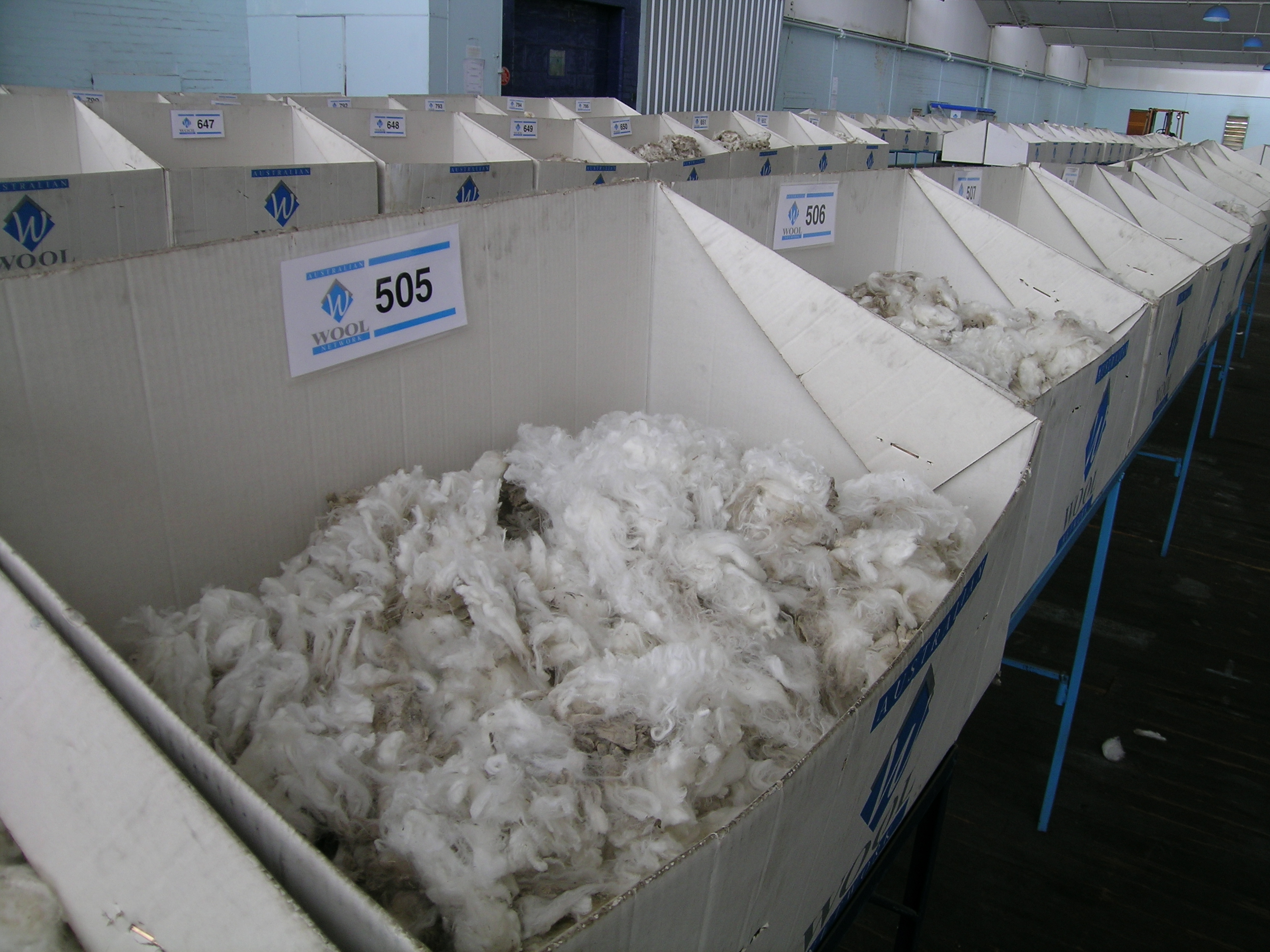
Merino wool samples for sale by auction, Newcastle, New South Wales

Open-cry auction remains a major sales channel in Australia. During the 2024–25 selling season, 1,419,576 bales were sold through the auction system for a total of A$1.94 billion.

Wool received by Australian brokers and dealers (tonnes/quarter) since 1973

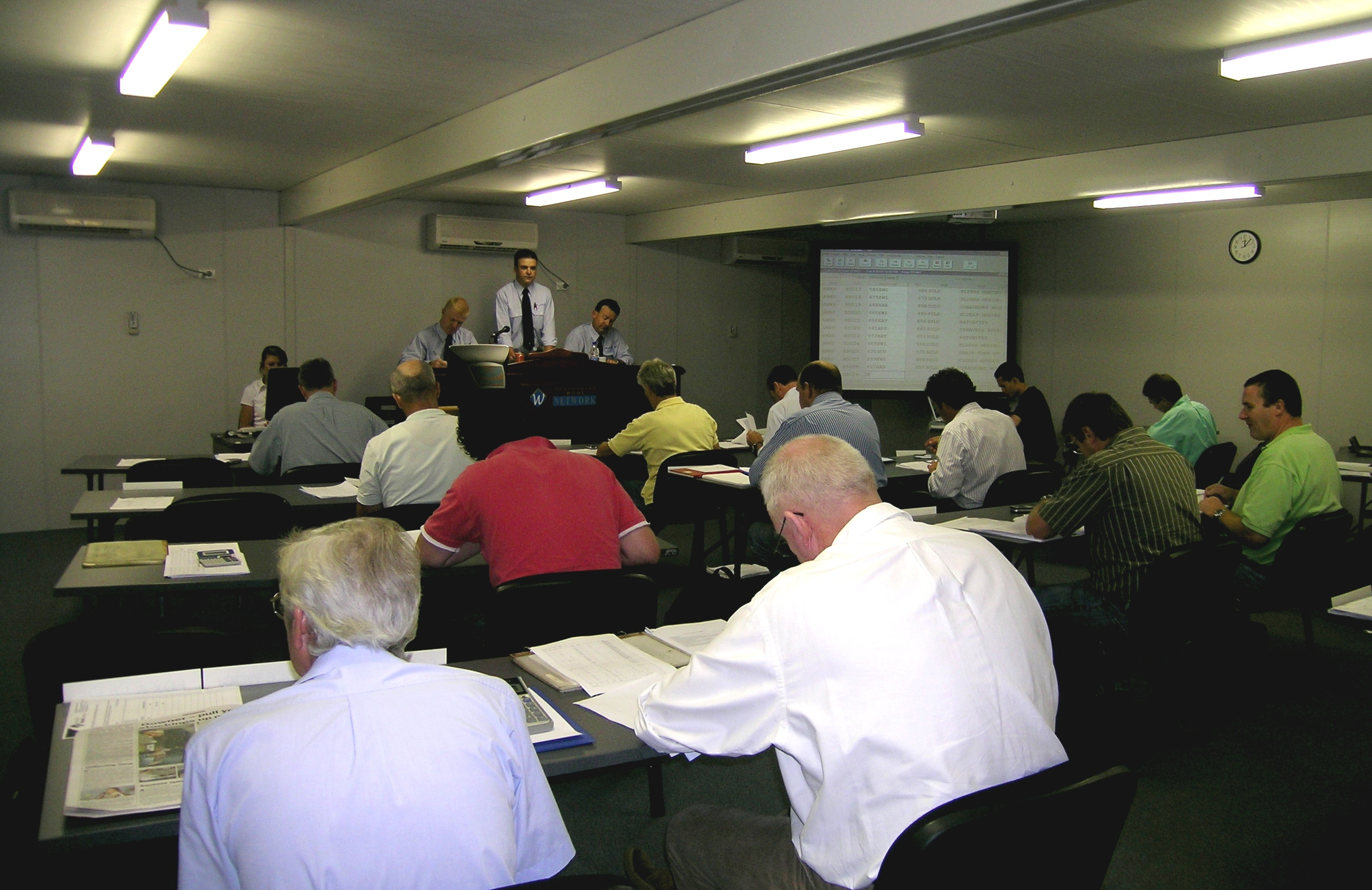
Wool buyers' room at a wool auction, Newcastle, New South Wales

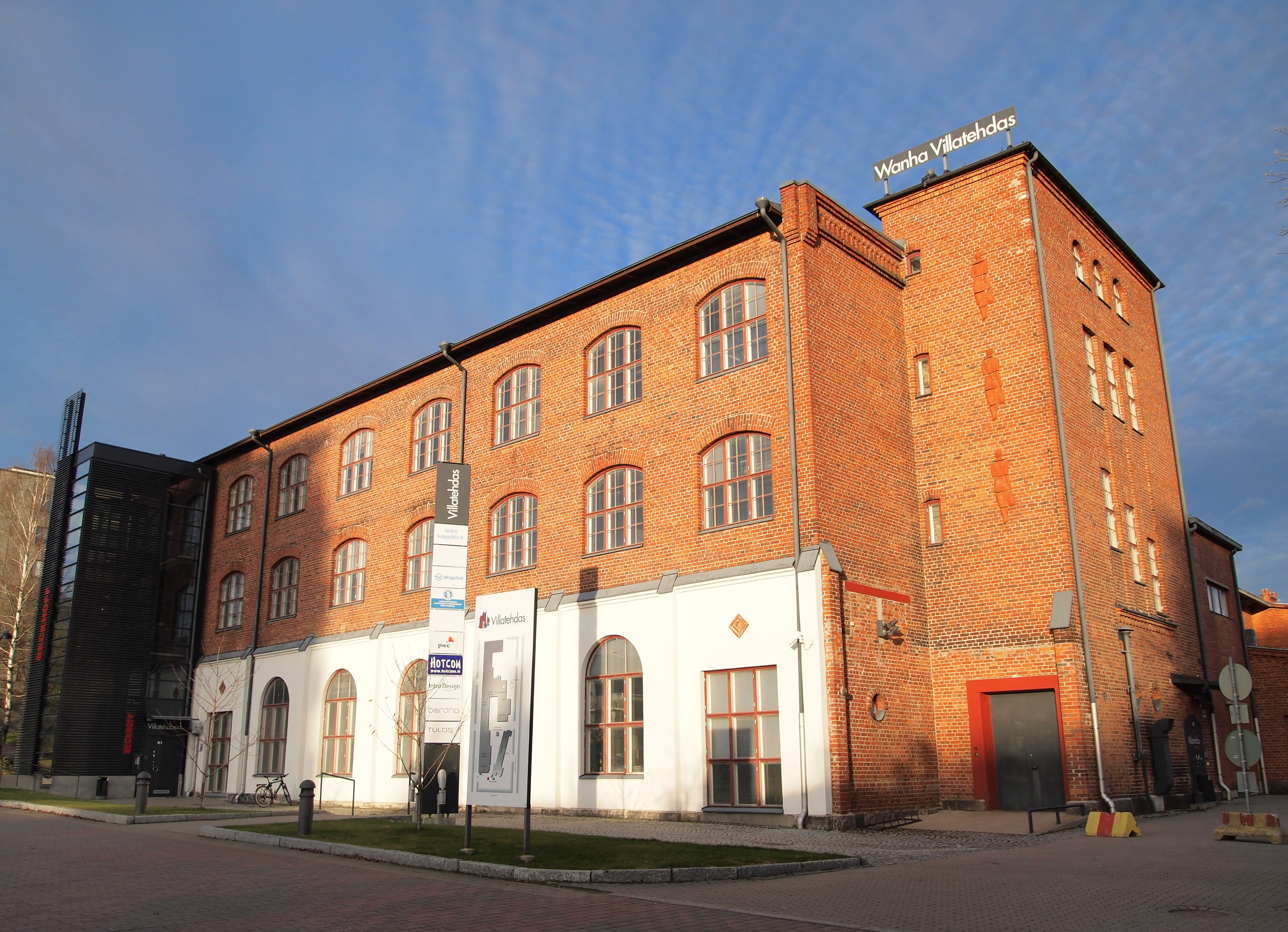
Wanha Villatehdas, a former wool factory in Hyvinkää, Finland

The British Wool Marketing Board, trading as British Wool, operates a central system that collects, grades, promotes, and sells fleece from about 30,000 registered producers in the United Kingdom.

In New Zealand, much strong wool is sold through auctions, while contracts and direct sales are more prominent in parts of the fine-wool sector.

United States sheep producers market wool with private or cooperative wool warehouses, but wool pools are common in many states. In some cases, wool is pooled in a local market area, but sold through a wool warehouse. Wool offered with objective measurement test results is preferred. Imported apparel wool and carpet wool goes directly to central markets, where it is handled by the large merchants and manufacturers.

== Textile Uses ==
=== Yarn ===
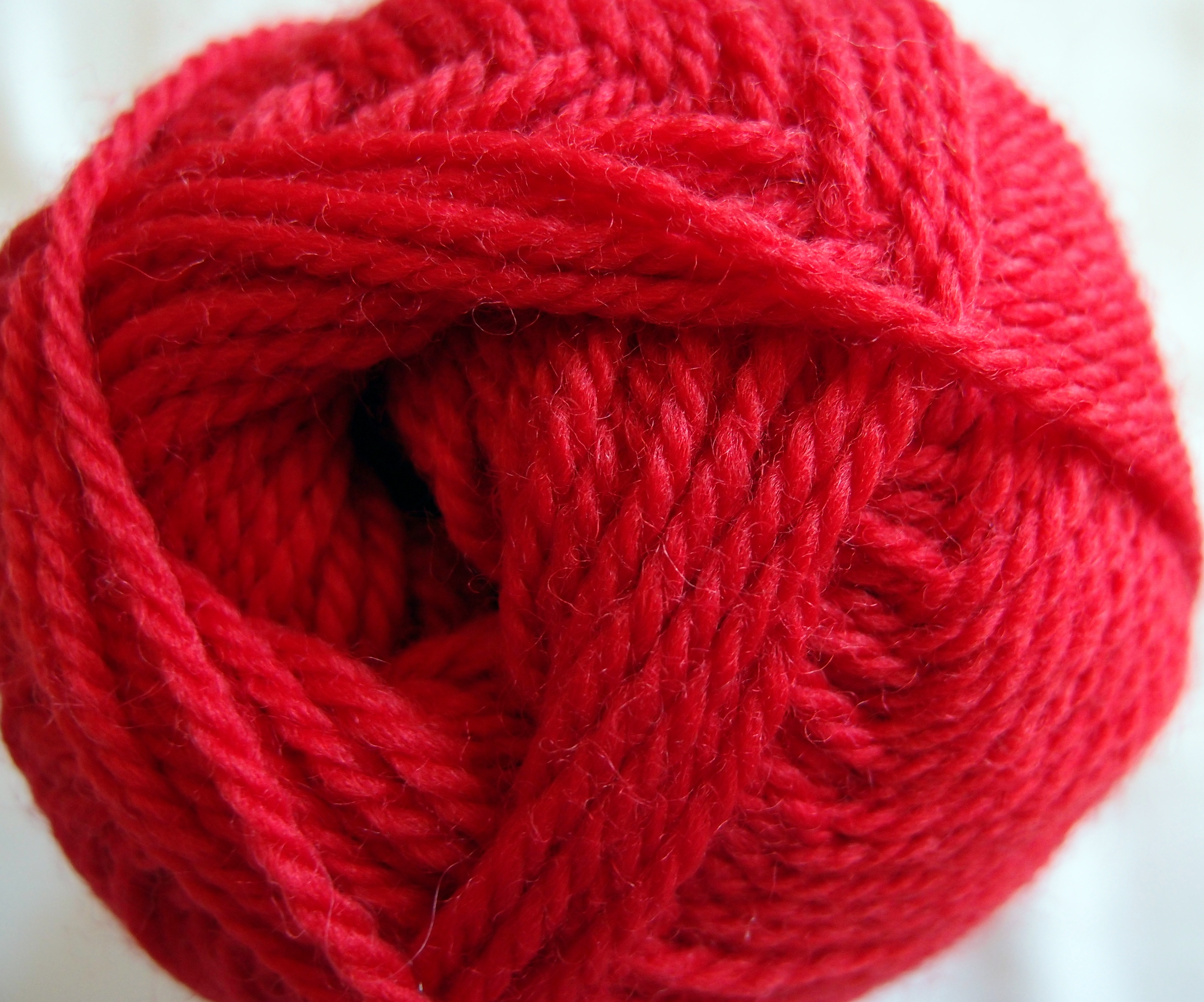
Woollen yarn

Most commonly, before being turned into clothing or other items, wool must first be processed into yarn. Different types of wool have different characteristics and can be turned into different types of yarn. For instance, shoddy or recycled wool is made by cutting or tearing apart existing wool fabric and respinning the resulting fibers. As this process makes the wool fibers shorter, the remanufactured fabric is inferior to the original. The recycled wool may be mixed with raw wool, wool noil, or another fiber such as cotton to increase the average fiber length. Such yarns are typically used as weft yarns with a cotton warp. This process was invented in the Heavy Woollen District of West Yorkshire and created a microeconomy in this area for many years.

Worsted is a strong, long-staple, combed wool yarn with a hard surface.

Woolen is a soft, short-staple, carded wool yarn typically used for knitting. In traditional weaving, woolen weft yarn (for softness and warmth) is frequently combined with a worsted warp yarn for strength on the loom.

After the yarn is made, it can be mixed with other materials and then woven, knit, or crocheted into the desired product.

=== Apparel ===
Any wool finer than 25 microns can be used for garments, while coarser grades are used for outerwear or rugs. The finer the wool, the softer it is, while coarser grades are more durable and less prone to pilling. Like silk, the proteinaceous nature of wool requires special detergents when being cleaned because laundry detergents made to clean cellulose-based fabrics often contain stain-removing enzymes that digest protein.

Wool's thermal resistance supports its use in clothing for both cold and hot climates. Bedouin and Tuareg clothing includes wool for insulation from daytime heat and cold nights. Semigrease wool can also be spun into water-resistant mittens and sweaters, including garments associated with the Aran Islands. A small study of woollen underwear reported fewer heat and sweat rashes, which the researchers associated with moisture absorption.

=== Other Uses ===
In addition to clothing, wool has been used for blankets, suits, horse rugs, saddle cloths, carpeting, insulation and upholstery. Dyed wool can be used to create other forms of art such as wet and needle felting. Wool felt covers piano hammers, and it is used to absorb odors and noise in heavy machinery and stereo speakers. Ancient Greeks lined their helmets with felt, and Roman legionnaires used breastplates made of wool felt.

Regional wool textiles include fulled Loden cloth in the Alpine countries, Harris Tweed from the Outer Hebrides, the Icelandic lopapeysa, and wool carpets such as Anatolian carpets and Gabbeh. The Super S scale is commonly encountered in fine suiting, while coarser durable yarns are used for rugs and upholstery.

Wool as well as cotton has also been traditionally used for cloth diapers. Wool fiber exteriors are hydrophobic (repel water) and the interior of the wool fiber is hygroscopic (attracts water); this makes a wool garment suitable cover for a wet diaper by inhibiting wicking, so outer garments remain dry. Wool felted and treated with lanolin is water resistant, air permeable, and slightly antibacterial, so it resists the buildup of odor. Some modern cloth diapers use felted wool fabric for covers, and there are several modern commercial knitting patterns for wool diaper covers.

As an animal protein, wool can be used as a soil fertilizer, being a slow-release source of nitrogen.

Researchers at the Royal Melbourne Institute of Technology school of fashion and textiles have discovered a blend of wool and Kevlar, the synthetic fiber widely used in body armor, was lighter, cheaper and worked better in damp conditions than Kevlar alone. Kevlar, when used alone, loses about 20% of its effectiveness when wet, so required an expensive waterproofing process. Wool increased friction in a vest with 28–30 layers of fabric, to provide the same level of bullet resistance as 36 layers of Kevlar alone.

Recycled wool is used for insulating the walls of McDonald's first UK net zero carbon restaurant, located in Market Drayton in Shropshire, which opened in December 2021. The building was verified against the UK Green Building Council's net zero carbon framework.

== Events ==
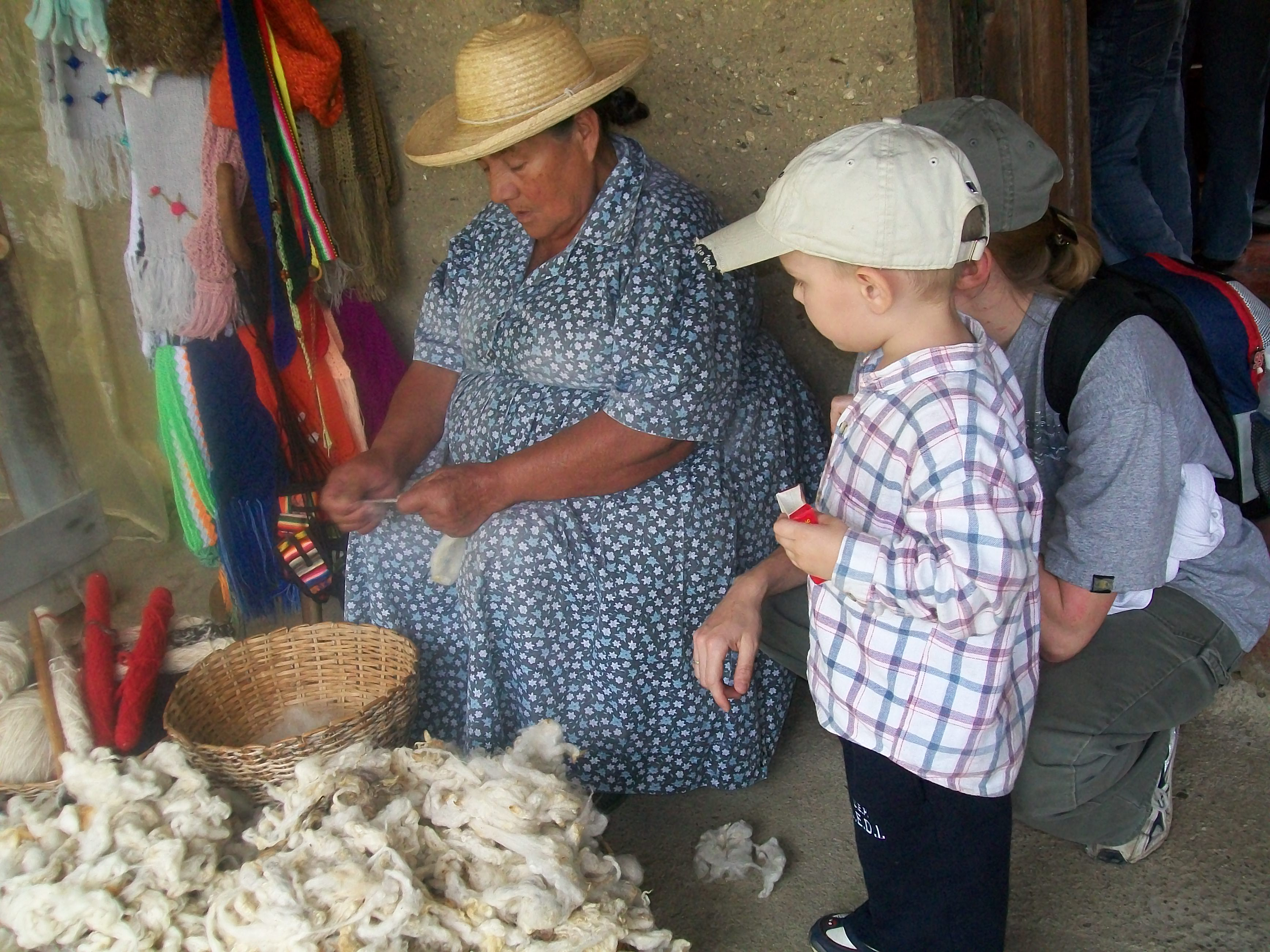
Andean woman sorting wool as part of the theme park Los Aleros in Mérida, Venezuela

A buyer of Merino wool, Ermenegildo Zegna, has offered awards for Australian wool producers. In 1963, the first Ermenegildo Zegna Perpetual Trophy was presented in Tasmania for growers of "Superfine skirted Merino fleece". In 1980, a national award, the Ermenegildo Zegna Trophy for Extrafine Wool Production (later renamed the Ermenegildo Zegna Unprotected Wool Trophy), was launched. In 1998, an Ermenegildo Zegna Protected Wool Trophy was launched for fleece from sheep coated for around nine months of the year.

In 2002, the Ermenegildo Zegna Vellus Aureum Trophy was launched for wool that is 13.9 microns or finer. Wool from Australia, New Zealand, Argentina, and South Africa may enter, and a winner is named from each country. In April 2008, New Zealand won the Ermenegildo Zegna Vellus Aureum Trophy for the first time with a fleece that measured 10.8 microns. This contest awards the winning fleece weight with the same weight in gold as a prize, hence the name.

In 2010, an ultrafine, 10-micron fleece, from Windradeen, near Pyramul, New South Wales, won the Ermenegildo Zegna Vellus Aureum International Trophy.

Since 2000, Loro Piana has awarded a cup for the world's finest bale of wool that produces just enough fabric for 50 tailor-made suits. The prize is awarded to an Australian or New Zealand wool grower who produces the year's finest bale.

The New England Merino Field Days are held every second year. The 2026 event took place at the Uralla Showground and presented Merino and meat-sheep studs from the region. Armidale has also hosted wool fashion awards and expos featuring clothing, handicrafts, shearing, and working-dog events.

The Australian Sheep and Wool Show is held in Bendigo, Victoria. The 2026 show is scheduled for 17 to 19 July and is to include sheep and fleece competitions, shearing and wool-handling events, fashion displays, and trade exhibits. In 2008, the fleece competition received 475 entries from all Australian states, with first and second prizes going to Northern Tablelands fleeces.

== See also ==
- Timeline of clothing and textiles technology

=== Production ===
- Glossary of sheep husbandry
- Lambswool
- Sheep husbandry
- Sheep shearing
- Wool bale

=== Processing ===
- Canvas work
- Carding
- Combing
- Dyeing
- Fulling
- Knitting
- Spinning
- Textile manufacturing
- Weaving

=== Refined products ===
- Felt
- Fiber art
- Tweed
- Worsted
- Yarn
- Wool crepe

=== Organizations ===
- British Wool Marketing Board
- IWTO
- Worshipful Company of Woolmen

=== Miscellaneous wool and animal textiles ===
- Alpaca wool
- Angora wool
- Camel hair
- Cashmere wool
- Chiengora wool
- Llama wool
- Lopi
- Mohair
- Pashmina
- Qiviut
- Shahtoosh
- Tibetan fur
- Vicuña wool
- Yak fiber

=== Inorganic wool ===
- Glass wool
- Mineral wool
