= Loro Piana =

Italian luxury brand

Loro Piana S.p.A.
- Type: Subsidiary
- Industry: Luxury
- Founded: 1924; 102 years ago, in Quarona, Italy
- Founder: Pietro Loro Piana
- Headquarters: Milan, Italy
- Number of locations: 182 stores worldwide (2025)
- Area served: Worldwide
- Key people: Frédéric Arnault (CEO)
- Revenue: €1.609 billion (2024)
- Net income: €389 million (2024)
- Parent: LVMH
- Website: loropiana.com

Loro Piana S.p.A. is an Italian luxury brand specialized in textile manufacturing and ready-to-wear clothing headquartered in Milan. Since its start as a merchant of cashmere, vicuña, linen and merino fabrics, Loro Piana expanded to design knitwear, leather goods, footwear, fragrance and related accessories. The company has three divisions: textiles, high fashion and luxury goods. Its core branding includes the Loro Piana family signature and coat-of-arms, depicting a European beech tree, a golden eagle, and two diagonal Stars of Italy, framed by flower thistles.

It was founded in 1924 by Pietro Loro Piana, an Italian engineer, in the Quarona comune of Piedmont. Since 2013, the company has been majority-owned by LVMH, a French multinational fashion conglomerate. Loro Piana is one of the largest purveyors of cashmere in the world, producing 14.8 million feet of fabric in 2012.

== History ==
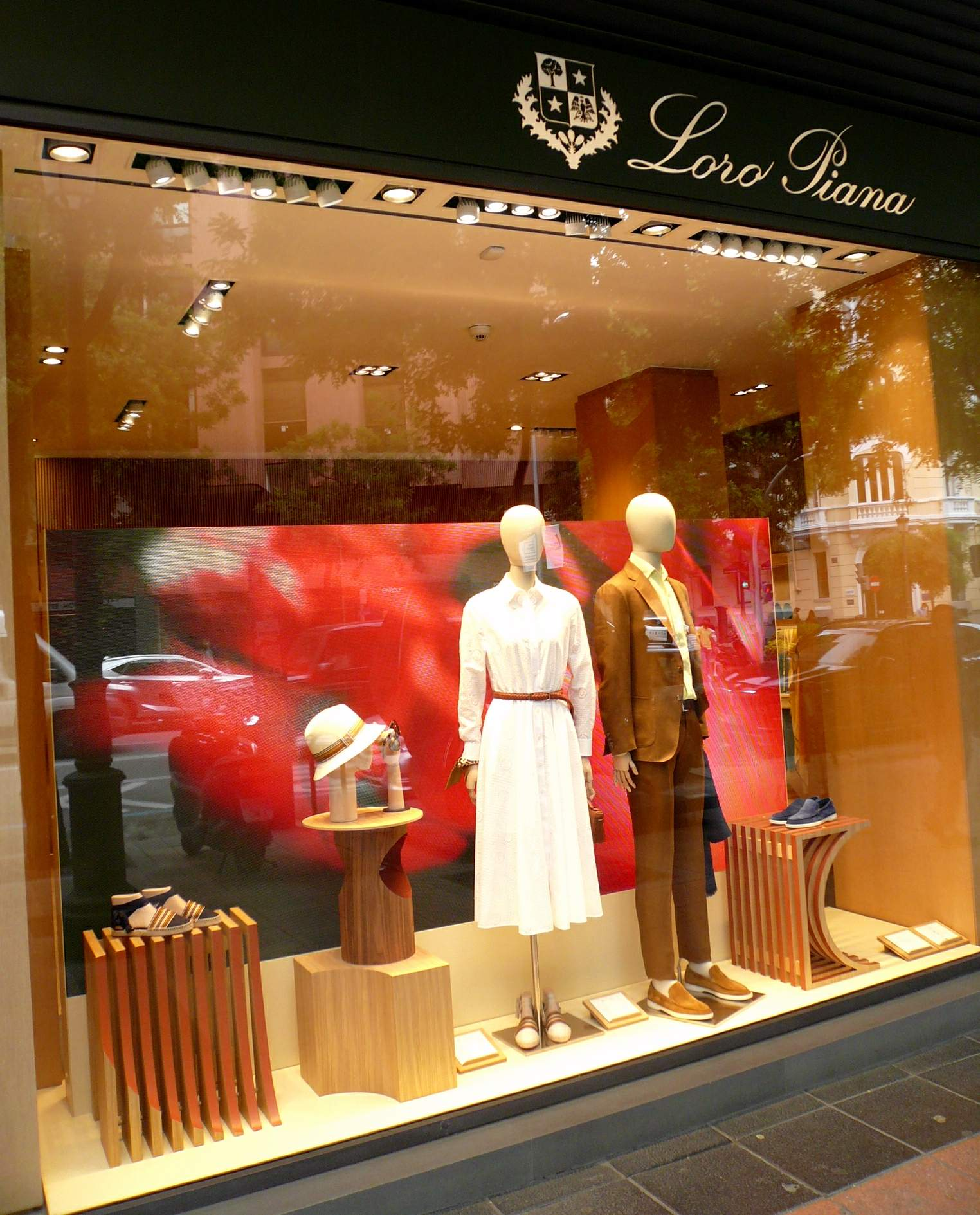
A boutique in Madrid, Spain, 2022

Originally from Trivero, the Loro Piana family started as merchants of woolen cloths at the beginning of the 19th century. In the second half of that century, the family moved its activity to Valsesia and founded the wool spinning mill Fratelli Lora e Compagnia, followed by the wool spinning mill Zignone & C. in Quarona at the beginning of the 20th century. In 1924, the engineer Pietro Loro Piana founded the company Loro Piana & C. the town. In the period immediately following World War II, Franco Loro Piana, nephew of Pietro, took over the family business and began exporting to Europe, the Americas, and Japan, contributing to the brand’s growing recognition within the international high-fashion sector.

During the 1970s, the company was directed by Franco's sons, Sergio and Pier Luigi. Their focus was on top-quality fabric development, including cashmere and extra-fine wools. Sergio and Pier Luigi's research gave birth to the Tasmanian fabric. In the 1980s, Sergio and Pier Luigi started to diversify the business, launching their first ready-to-wear collection and creating the luxury goods division.

Loro Piana began working with vicuña fiber in 1994. In 1997, the company reached an agreement with the government of Peru and local villages in the Andes in 1997 to only source vicuña fiber from living animals raised in the area. A decade later, in 2008, Loro Piana helped finance Peru's first private nature preserve for vicuñas, as part of their business agreement. The first Loro Piana retail store opened in 1998 in Milan, followed shortly thereafter by a store in Venice. From the late 1990s, the brand expanded its activities beyond apparel to include textile accessories, footwear, and home furnishings. In 2013, Loro Piana announced an investment of USD 1.6 million to acquire a majority stake in a company holding the rights to shear vicuñas in a designated area of Argentina.

In July 2013, LVMH acquired an 80% stake in Loro Piana, becoming their majority shareholder, through a $2.6 billion cash and debt deal. Sergio and Pier Luigi Loro Piana retained a 20% stake in the company and continued in their management roles. Following a brief illness, Sergio Loro Piana died in Milan the same year, on December, 20. Antoine Arnault became chairman, while Matthieu Brisset was appointed chief executive officer. In 2016, Fabio d’Angelantonio succeeded Brisset. The following year, LVMH acquired another 5% stake in the company. In 2021, a leadership change took place and Damien Bertrand was appointed Chief Executive Officer.

Since 2022, Loro Piana has established its headquarters at Cortile della Seta in Milan's Brera district. In 2024, the company marked its 100th anniversary, celebrating the milestone with a series of events, including the exhibition If You Know, You Know. Loro Piana’s Quest for Excellence in Shanghai.

In May 2025, Frédéric Arnault succeeded Damien Bertrand as Chief Executive Officer. In July, the Milan court placed Loro Piana under judicial administration. The company was accused of having indirectly outsourced part of its production to an external supplier, which in turn irregularly involved third-party companies where cases of labor exploitation and illegal working conditions were allegedly identified. In a statement, Loro Piana said it had terminated ties with its supplier within 24 hours of discovering the existence of its subcontractors on 20 May 2025, and was fully cooperating with authorities. The measure was, however, lifted early by the court, which noted the company’s rapid implementation of corrective measures and best practices, stating that “the virtuous course undertaken and successfully completed […] clearly demonstrates the company’s commitment to continuing the efforts already initiated”.

At the end of 2025, the group LVMH acquired additional shares worth approximately €1 billion from the founding family, increasing its stake in Loro Piana from 85% to 94% and thereby strengthening its control over the company.

=== CEOs ===
- 2013–2016: Matthieu Brisset
- 2016–2021: Fabio d'Angelantonio
- 2021–2025: Damien Bertrand
- 2025–present: Frédéric Arnault

== Operations ==
The company handles the main stages of the production process, from raw materials to finished products. The company’s manufacturing facilities are located in Italy, primarily in the Valsesia area in the province of Vercelli. Its only out-of-Italy manufacturing facility is located in the Ulaanbaatar region of Mongolia.

Its products are distributed across Europe, North America, the Middle East, China, South Korea, Indonesia, and Japan. The company has developed a network of directly operated stores, progressively opened since the mid-1990s, located in some of the world’s most exclusive shopping streets and has sold its products online since 2012.

== Logo ==
The logo, introduced in 1951, includes the Loro Piana family signature and coat-of-arms, depicting a European beech tree, a golden eagle, and two diagonal Stars of Italy, framed by flower thistles.

== Sponsoring ==
During its history, Loro Piana has sponsored a range of sports competitions, especially in horse riding and sailing, from the Piazza di Siena horse race to the Superyacht Regatta in Porto Cervo and races in Saint-Tropez and St. Barths, among others.

Since 1985, the company has collaborated with the Italian Equestrian Sports Federation,.

Since 2016, Loro Piana has been providing the official uniform of the European team competing at the biennial Ryder Cup.

== See also ==
- Made in Italy
- Vitale Barberis Canonico, an Italian fabric mill
