= Pier Luigi Loro Piana =

Italian businessman (born 1951)

- Born: December 1951 (age 74); Milan, Italy
- Spouse: married
- Children: 3
- Parent: Franco Loro Piana
- Relatives: Sergio Loro Piana (brother)

Pier Luigi Loro Piana (born December 1951) is an Italian billionaire businessman. He was born in Milan, Italy, the son of Franco Loro Piana. He received a bachelor's degree in economics from Bocconi University in Milan.

In 2013, Piana and his late brother Sergio sold an 80% stake in the Loro Piana fashion company to the French billionaire Bernard Arnault's LVMH for US$2.6 billion. Pier Luigi owns an estimated 10% stake in the Loro Piana company.

He is married with three children, and lives in Milan, Italy.

He hosts the annual Loro Piana Superyacht Regatta, and had a 130-foot yacht, My Song, which was the fourth incarnation of this boat. My Song was lost in a shipping accident while en route from the Caribbean to the Balearic Islands in late May 2019.
