= George Gummer =

Wales international rugby league footballer

Personal information
- Full name: George Gummer
- Born: Wales
- Died: unknown

Playing information
- Position: Centre
Club
Years	Team	Pld	T	G	FG	P
≤1936–≥36	Barrow
1945	→ Wigan (guest)	1	0	0		0
≤1946–≥46	Oldham	42	16	2		52
≤1947–≥47	Rochdale Hornets
	Total	43	16	2	0	52
Representative
Years	Team	Pld	T	G	FG	P
1936	Wales	2	1			3

George Gummer (birth unknown – death unknown) was a Welsh professional rugby league footballer who played in the 1930s and 1940s. He played at representative level for Wales, and at club level for Barrow, Oldham and Rochdale Hornets (captain), as a centre. He also appeared for Wigan as a World War II guest player.

== International honours ==
George Gummer won caps for Wales while at Barrow 1936 2-caps.
