= Scott Gummer =

American writer and editor

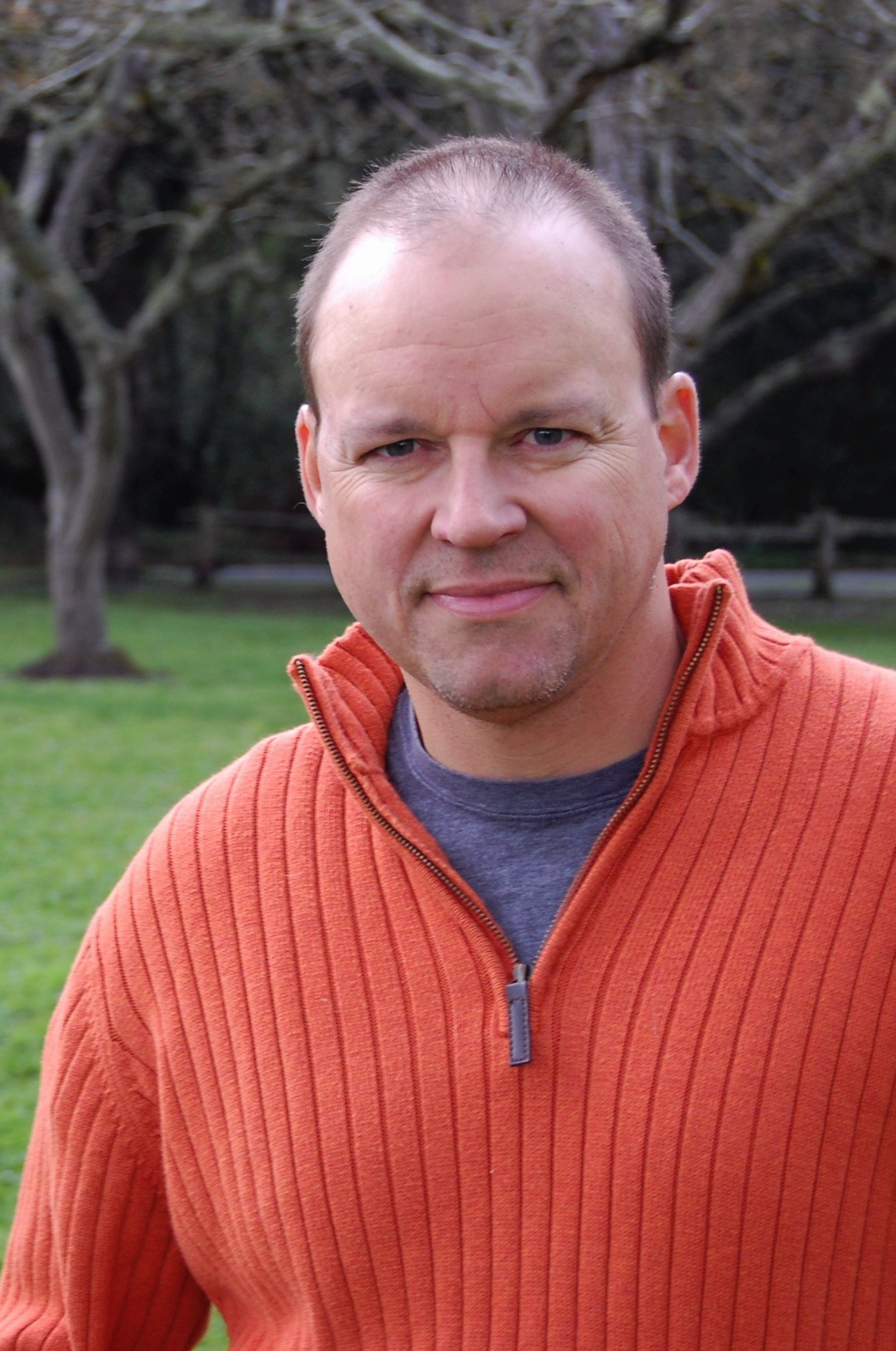
- Gummer in Sonoma County, California, 2009
- Occupation: Novelist, journalist, editor
- Education: University of Oregon, 1986

Website
- scottgummer.com

Scott Gummer is an American writer and editor who lives in the Northern California wine country.

His book Parents Behaving Badly: A Novel was published by Touchstone Books in 2011.

== Biography ==
Gummer was born in Sonoma County, California. He held a series of odd after school and summer jobs including boathouse attendant, suit store clerk, airplane washer, carpet store janitor, winery gardener, and truck brake assembler. Gummer attended Santa Rosa High School then the University of Oregon.

He met his wife, Lisa, in the dorms during their first week at Oregon. The couple married in 1988 and have four children.

== Career ==
Upon graduating from Oregon with a degree in journalism and an emphasis on advertising, Gummer moved to New York City to work on Madison Avenue. But after 18 months spent toiling in the traffic department at the Foote Cone & Belding ad agency, Gummer switched to magazine editorial, starting out as a fact-checker at GQ and later moving to LIFE, where he would write and produce photo essays with photographers including Harry Benson, Galen Rowell, Robb Kendrick, Bob Sacha, Theo Westenberger, Co Rentmeester, Taro Yamasaki, and others.

Gummer left New York in 1992 and moved with his family back to the Bay Area, where he freelanced on a wide variety of topics for magazines including Vanity Fair, This Old House, Skiing, Sports Illustrated, and Fortune. From 1995 to 1998, Gummer took a detour from writing and worked with entertainment software giant EA Sports overseeing marketing for the NHL hockey and PGA Tour/Tiger Woods golf franchises.

In all, Gummer has written over 250 articles for more than 40 different magazines, many about travel and golf. From 2003 to 2005 he was Senior Writer/Travel Editor with GOLF magazine, after which he launched his career as an author.

Gummer's first book was The Seventh at St. Andrews (Gotham, 2007), a process story that chronicled the creation of the David McLay Kidd-designed Castle Course in Scotland. The book was not a how-to text on building a golf course, but rather the story of the people and the politics behind the scenes.

Another non-fiction golf book followed, Homer Kelley's Golfing Machine: The Curious Quest that Solved Golf (Gotham, 2009). It tells the story of a simpleton from Washington state who devoted his life to solving the physics and geometry behind the golf swing. In 1969, after 30 years of research, Kelley self-published his cult classic book The Golfing Machine. Kelley died in 1983, but his book, now in its seventh edition, continues to be required reading for golfers.

Parents Behaving Badly (Touchstone, 2011) is satire about youth sports gone wild and Gummer's first work of fiction.

As an editor, Gummer has overseen Philadelphia Phillies: An Extraordinary Tradition (2010) and Mac Court Memories (2010), the University of Oregon's illustrated history of the school's legendary campus arena. He is also the Executive Editor of America's Team: The Authorized History of the Dallas Cowboys (2010), Blazermania: The Official History of the Portland Trail Blazers (2010), and the 50th anniversary book of the Los Angeles Angels of Anaheim (2011).

== Bibliography ==
=== Author ===
==== Fiction ====
- Parents Behaving Badly: A Novel

==== Non-Fiction ====
- Homer Kelley's Golfing Machine
- The Seventh at St. Andrews

=== Editor ===
- Philadelphia Phillies: An Extraordinary Tradition
- America's Team: The Authorized History of the Dallas Cowboys
- Blazermania: The Official History of the Portland Trail Blazers
