= Loro =

Loro may refer to:

- Loro Ciuffenna, in the Province of Arezzo, Tuscany
- Loro Piceno, in the Province of Macerata, Marche
- Loro language of Nigeria
- Loro (film), an Italian film directed by Paolo Sorrentino
- "Loro", a song by the US rock band Pinback
- Lobe on receive only, a radar tracking method
