= Quarona =

- Comune
- Comune di Quarona
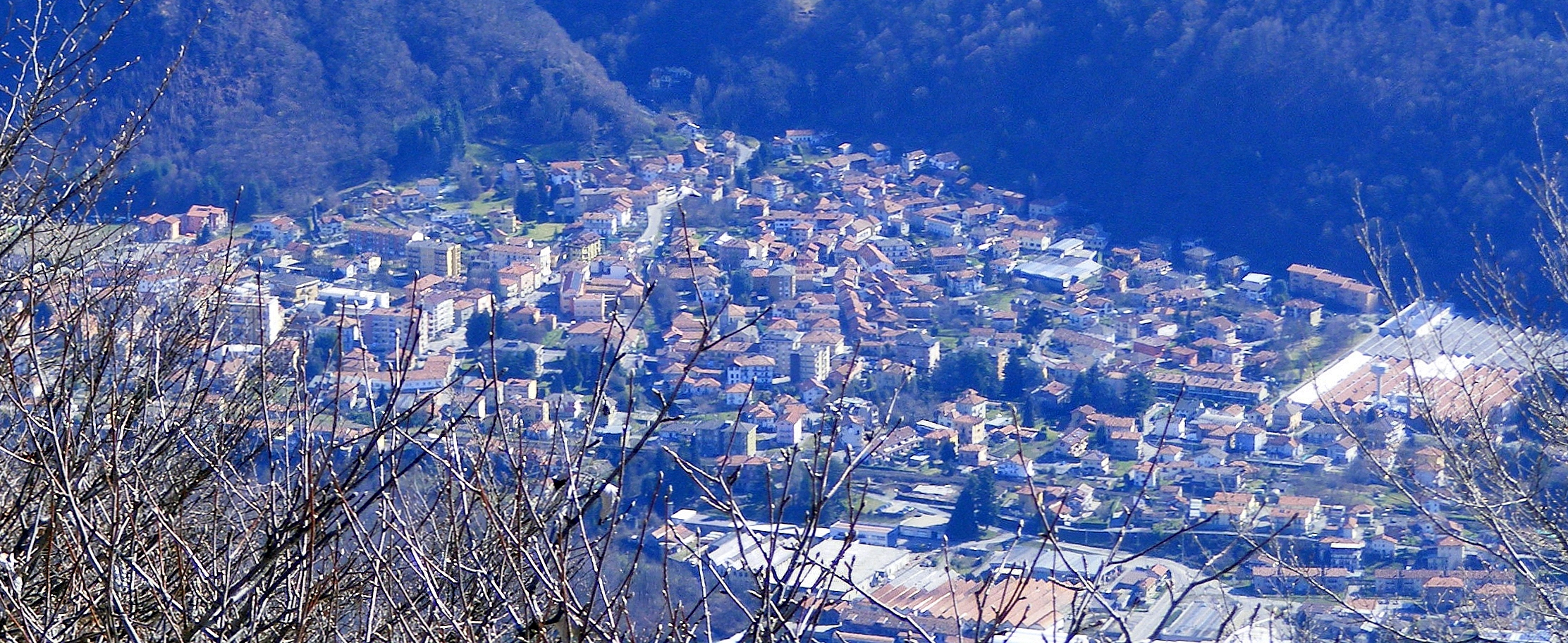

- Coat of arms

- Location within Italy Location within Piedmont
- Coordinates: 45°46′N 8°16′E
- Country: Italy
- Region: Piedmont
- Province: Vercelli (VC)
- Frazioni: Doccio, Valmaggiore

Government
  - Mayor: Francesco Pietrasanta

Area
  - Total: 16.0 km^{2} (6.2 sq mi)
- Elevation: 407 m (1,335 ft)

Population (August 31, 2010)
  - Total: 4,299
  - Density: 269/km^{2} (696/sq mi)
- Demonym: Quaronesi
- Time zone: UTC+1 (CET)
  - Summer (DST): UTC+2 (CEST)
- Postal code: 13017
- Dialing code: 0163
- Patron saint: St. John the Baptist
- Website: Official website

Quarona is a comune (municipality) in the Province of Vercelli in the Italian region Piedmont, located about 90 kilometres (56 mi) northeast of Turin and about 50 kilometres (31 mi) north of Vercelli, along the Sesia River.
