= International Free and Open Source Software Law Review =

- Discipline: Law review
- Language: English

Publication details
- History: 2009-2019
- Publisher: The Editorial Committee of the International Free and Open Source Software Law Review (UK)
- Frequency: Biannual, then rolling
- Open access: yes
- License: Indicatively: Creative Commons BY, BY ND or similar (allowing commercial reuse)

Standard abbreviations
- ISO 4: Int. Free Open Source Softw. Law Rev.

Indexing
- ISSN: 1877-6922
- OCLC no.: 424652964

Links
- Journal homepage

The International Free and Open Source Software Law Review (also known as 'IFOSS L. Rev.', 'IFOSSLR', or 'IFOSS L. R.') was an English language law review focusing on free and open source software.

== Overview ==
IFOSS L. Rev. was intended to provide a neutral forum for debate and analysis of legal issues connected with Free and Open Source Software. Articles were subject to peer review where appropriate and the editors exercise a policy of independence from sponsors and facilitators.

The review was initially published twice yearly and subsequently moved to a rolling release. All editions were available to download in PDF and HTML formats from the journal's website, and are now available from the JOLTS website. Readers were encouraged to copy and share their copies of IFOSS L. Rev. The publication qualified as a gold Open Access journal under the open access publishing scheme.

The journal permitted a variety of licences to be used for individual articles including Creative Commons, and where derivative works are prohibited special exceptions permitting translations into other languages are encouraged. A policy against non-commercial only restrictions exists. The copyright policy was subsequently amended to require more permissive licensing, with CC-BY being the most restrictive permitted.

IFOSS L. Rev. merged into successor title Journal of Open Law, Technology and Society (JOLTS) in 2019. JOLTS has adopted much of the same ethos, and approach of IFOSS L. Rev. All content published by IFOSS L. Rev. is available on the JOLTS website.

== History ==
IFOSS L. Rev. was launched with the release of Volume 1, Issue 1 on the 13 July 2009, and published its second issue in January 2010. In 2019, it announced that it was re‑branding as Journal of Open Law, Technology and Society and extending the publication's scope, while retaining the same ethos and open access approach.

== Editorial Committee ==
The Editorial Committee of the Review was initially made up from delegates of the European Legal Network, a non-partisan professional network of Free Software legal experts. Many members of the network actually come from outside Europe. This network is facilitated by Free Software Foundation Europe (FSFE), though membership extends across a broad spectrum of interests engaging in Free and Open Source Software. FSFE exerted no editorial control over the Editorial Committee.
