= Cruelty to animals =

Negligent or abusive action against animals by humans

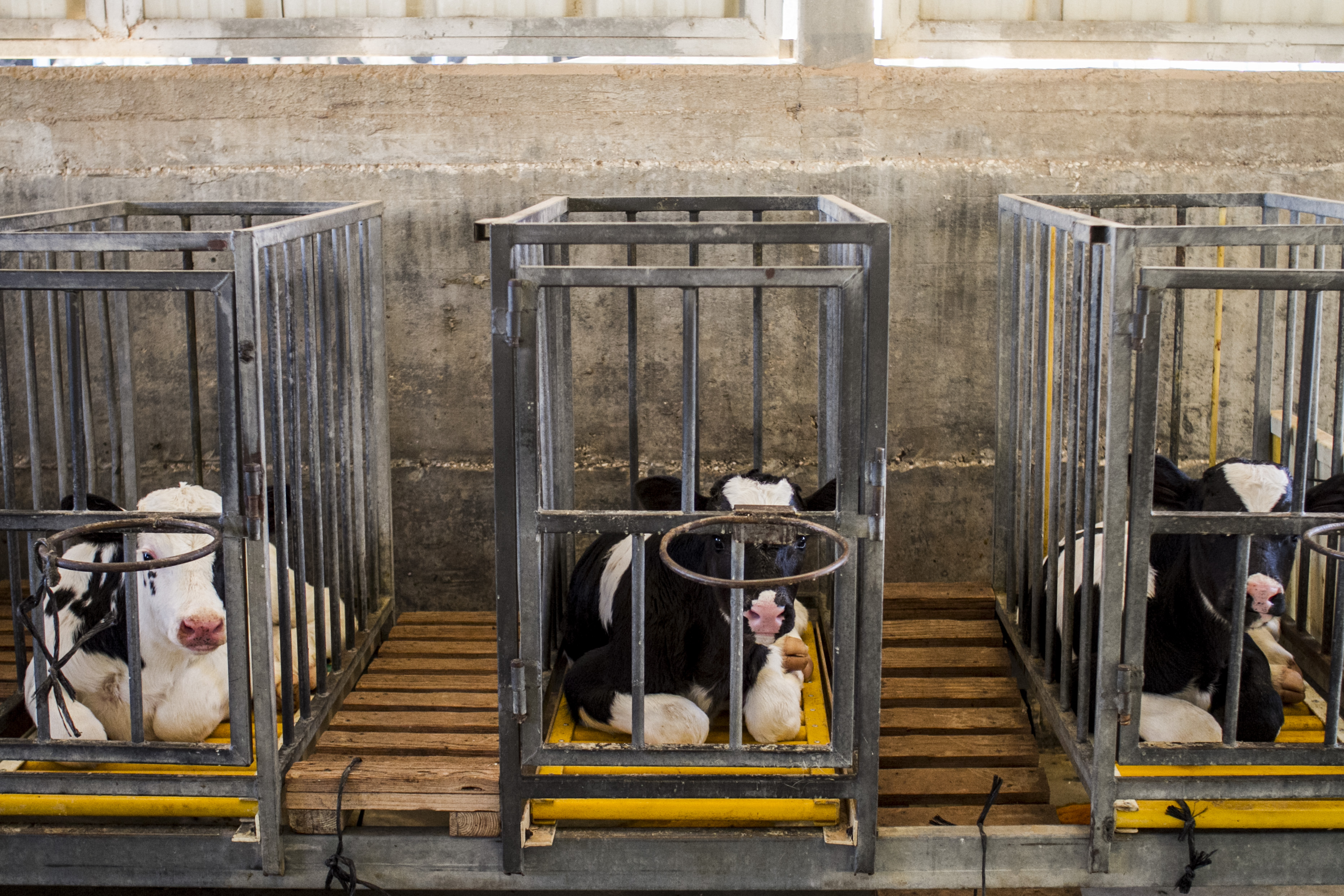
Calves in cages small for their size

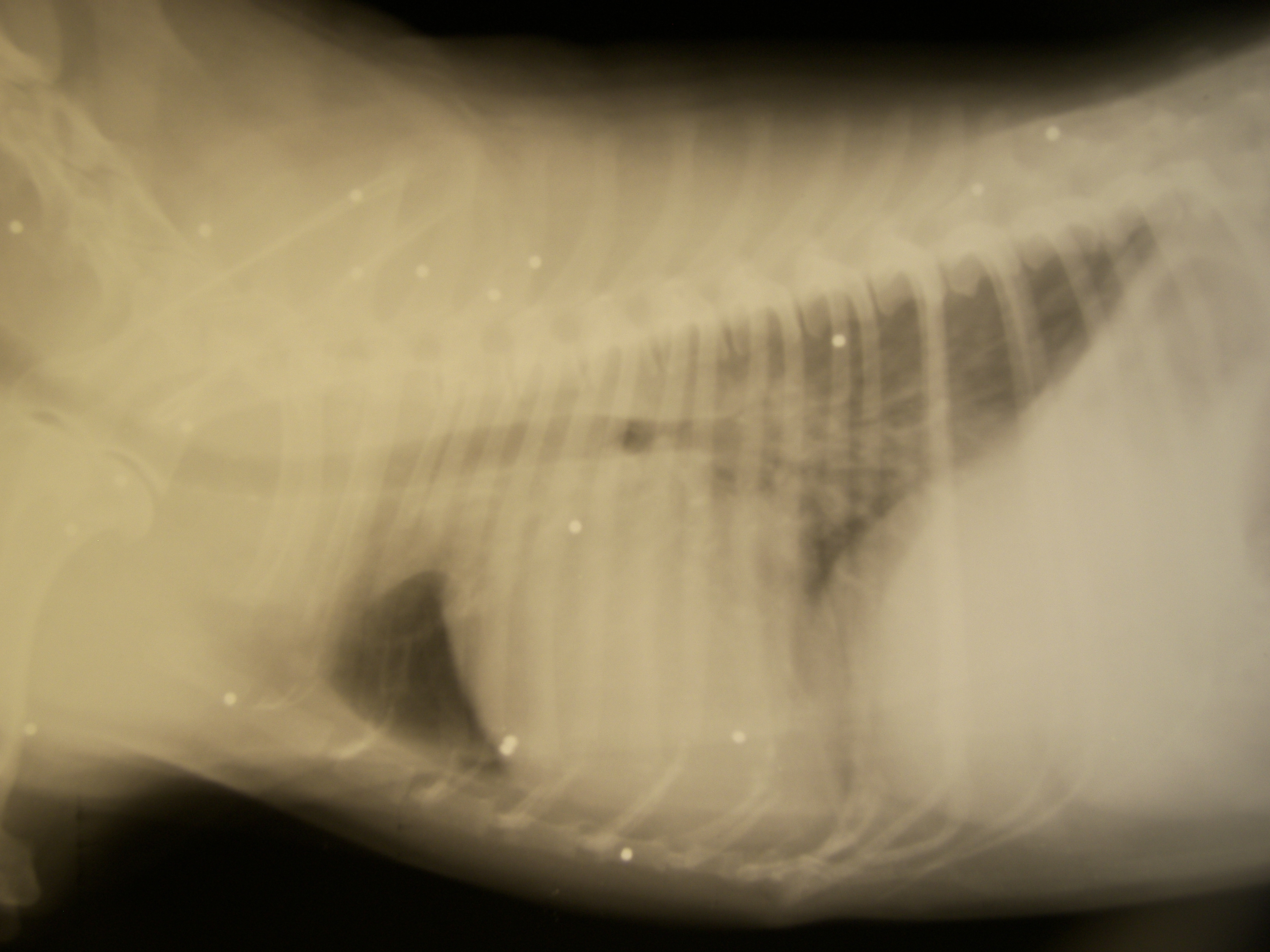
Chest X-ray of a cat that has been shot; the white spots are shotgun pellets

Cruelty to animals, also called animal abuse, animal neglect or animal cruelty, is the infliction of suffering or harm by humans upon animals, either by omission (neglect) or by commission. More narrowly, it can be the causing of harm or suffering for specific achievements, such as the inhumane killing of animals for food or the killing of animals for entertainment; cruelty to animals is sometimes due to a mental disorder, referred to as zoosadism. Divergent approaches to laws concerning animal cruelty occur in different jurisdictions throughout the world. For example, some laws govern methods of killing animals for food, clothing, or other products, and other laws concern the keeping of animals for entertainment, education, research, or pets. There are several conceptual approaches to the issue of cruelty to animals.

Even though some practices, like animal fighting, are widely acknowledged as cruel, not all people or cultures have the same definition of what constitutes animal cruelty. Many would claim that docking a piglet's tail without an anesthetic constitutes cruelty. Others would respond that it is a routine technique for meat production to prevent harm later in the pig's life. Additionally, laws governing animal cruelty vary from country to country. For instance, docking a piglet's tail is routine in the US but prohibited in the European Union (EU).

Utilitarian advocates argue from the position of costs and benefits and vary in their conclusions as to the allowable treatment of animals. Some utilitarians argue for a weaker approach that is closer to the animal welfare position, whereas others argue for a position that is similar to animal rights. Animal rights theorists criticize these positions, arguing that the words "unnecessary" and "humane" are subject to widely differing interpretations and that animals have basic rights. They say that most animal use itself is unnecessary and a cause of suffering, so the only way to ensure protection for animals is to end their status as property and to ensure that they are never viewed as a substance or as non-living things.

== Definition and viewpoints ==
Throughout history, some individuals, like Leonardo da Vinci for example, who once purchased caged birds in order to set them free, were concerned about cruelty to animals. His notebooks also record his anger with the fact that humans used their dominance to raise animals for slaughter. According to contemporary philosopher Nigel Warburton, for most of human history the dominant view has been that animals are there for humans to do with as they see fit. Sociologist David Nibert emphasizes that the process of domestication dramatically increased the exploitation of animals by humans, particularly in Eurasia, and asserts that this paved the way for the creation of a modern day, capitalist–driven animal–industrial complex. Much of this exploitation involved not only direct physical violence, but also structural violence as their systemic oppression and enslavement "resulted in their inability to meet their basic needs, the loss of self-determination, and the loss of opportunity to live in a natural way." He says that the remains of domesticated animals from thousands of years ago found during archaeological excavations revealed numerous bone pathologies, which provide evidence of extreme suffering:

Excavations from 8500 BCE revealed bone deformities in enslaved goats and cows and provided "some indication of stress, presumably due to the conditions in which these early domestic animals were kept." Remains of sheep and goats from the early Bronze Age show a marked decrease in bone thickness, reflecting calcium deficiencies "resulting from the combined effects of poor nutrition and intensive milking."

Several religious traditions have promoted animal welfare as an important or fundamental concept, and encouraged vegetarianism or veganism. Examples include Buddhism, Jainism, Hinduism (with certain animals being considered sacred), and some forms of Judaism (many Orthodox Jews do not wear leather).

René Descartes believed that non-humans are automata — complex machines with no soul, mind, or reason. In Cartesian dualism, consciousness was unique to human among all other animals and linked to physical matter by divine grace. However, close analysis shows that many human features such as complex sign usage, tool use, and self-consciousness can be found in some animals. In 2012, a prominent group of neuroscientists signed the Cambridge Declaration on Consciousness. It stated that humans are not the only conscious beings, and that many other animals, including all mammals and birds, also possess consciousness, challenging the Cartesian view of animals as mechanical beings.

Charles Darwin, by presenting the theory of evolution, revolutionized the way that humans viewed their relationship with other species. Darwin believed that not only did human beings have a direct kinship with other animals, but the latter had social, mental, and moral lives too. Later, in The Descent of Man (1871), he wrote: "There is no fundamental difference between man and the higher mammals in their mental faculties."

Modern philosophers and intellectuals, such as Peter Singer and Tom Regan, have argued that animals' ability to feel pain as humans do makes their well-being worthy of equal consideration. There are many precursors of this train of thought. Jeremy Bentham, the founder of utilitarianism, famously wrote in his An Introduction to the Principles of Morals and Legislation (1789):

The question is not, can they reason nor can they talk? but, can they suffer?

These arguments have prompted some to suggest that animals' well-being should enter a social welfare function directly, not just indirectly via its effect only on human well-being. Many countries have now formally recognized animal sentience and animal suffering, and have passed anti-cruelty legislation in response.

== Forms ==
Animal cruelty can be broken down into two main categories: active and passive. Passive cruelty is typified by cases of neglect, in which the cruelty is a lack of action rather than the action itself. Oftentimes passive animal cruelty is accidental, born of ignorance. In many cases of neglect in which an investigator believes that the cruelty occurred out of ignorance, the investigator may attempt to educate the pet owner, then revisit the situation. In more severe cases, exigent circumstances may require that the animal be removed for veterinary care.

=== Animal testing ===
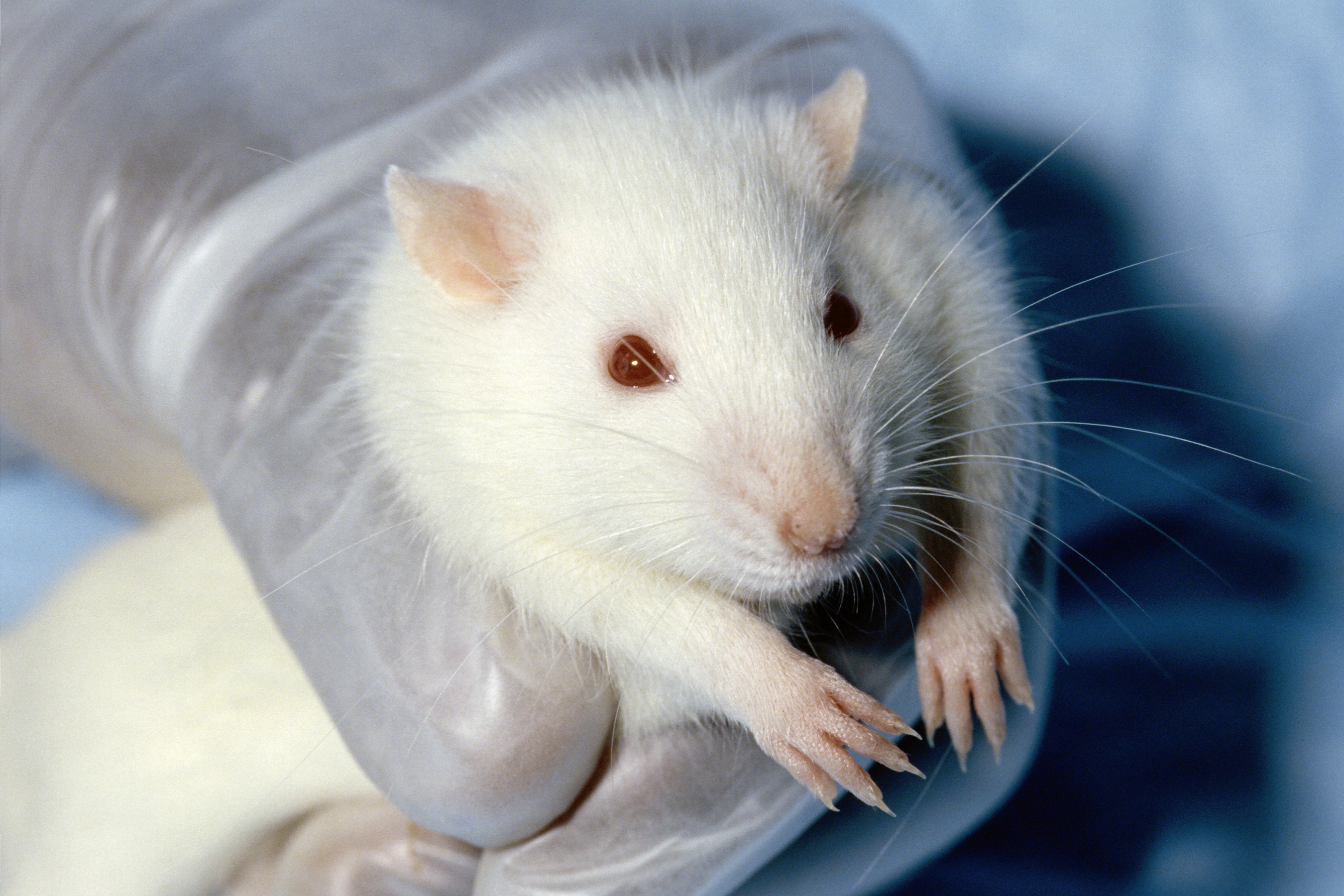
A Wistar laboratory rat

Animal testing is regulated to varying degrees in different countries. In some cases it is strictly controlled while others have more relaxed regulations. There are ongoing debates about the ethics and necessity of animal testing. Proponents argue that it has led to significant advancements in medicine and other fields while opponents raise concerns about cruelty towards animals and question its effectiveness and reliability.

Laboratory animal sourcing can and has involved animal cruelty, particularly when animals are obtained through illegal or unethical means, or when regulations are not followed. Even when legal and regulated, the use of animals in research is ethically controversial because it often involves causing harm or death to sentient beings.

==== International trade in primates ====
The international trade in primates sees 32,000 wild non-human primates (NHPs) trapped and sold on the international market every year. They are sold mostly for use in animal testing, but also for food, for exhibition in zoos and circuses, and for private use as companion animals.

==== Unnecessary scientific experiments or demonstrations ====
Worldwide laws regarding testing cosmetics on animals: Nationwide ban on all cosmetic testing on animals / Partial ban on cosmetic testing on animals^{1}; Ban on the sale of cosmetics tested on animals / No ban on any cosmetic testing on animals; Unknown^{1}Some methods of testing are excluded from the ban or the laws vary within the country.

Under all three of the conceptual approaches to animal cruelty discussed above, performing unnecessary experiments or demonstrations upon animals that cause them substantial pain or distress may be viewed as cruelty. Due to changes in ethical standards, this type of cruelty tends to be less common today than it used to be in the past. For example, schoolroom demonstrations of oxygen depletion routinely suffocated birds by placing them under a glass cover, and animals were suffocated in the Cave of Dogs to demonstrate the density and toxicity of carbon dioxide to curious travelers on the Grand Tour.

=== Cruelties in connection with meals ===
Cattle in religion and mythology are considered sacred in the Indian religions of Hinduism, Jainism and Buddhism, as well as in some Chinese folk religion and in African paganism. Cattle played other major roles in many religions, including those of ancient Egypt, ancient Greece, ancient Israel, and ancient Rome. In some regions, especially most states of India, the slaughter of cattle is prohibited and their meat (beef) may be taboo.

The production of foie gras (the liver of a duck or a goose that has been specially fattened) involves the force-feeding of birds with more food than they would eat in the wild, and more than they would voluntarily eat domestically. The feed, usually corn boiled with fat (to facilitate ingestion), deposits large amounts of fat in the liver, thereby producing the fatty consistency sought by some gastronomes.

Pinikpikan is a chicken or duck dish from the mountains of the Cordillera region in the Philippines. As a tradition of the indigenous Igorot people, pinikpikan is prepared by beating a live chicken to death with a stick prior to cooking. The beating bruises the chicken's flesh by bringing blood to its surface, which is said to improve the flavour after cooking. The act of beating the chicken, while done in preparation of the dish, violates the Philippine Animal Welfare Act 1998.

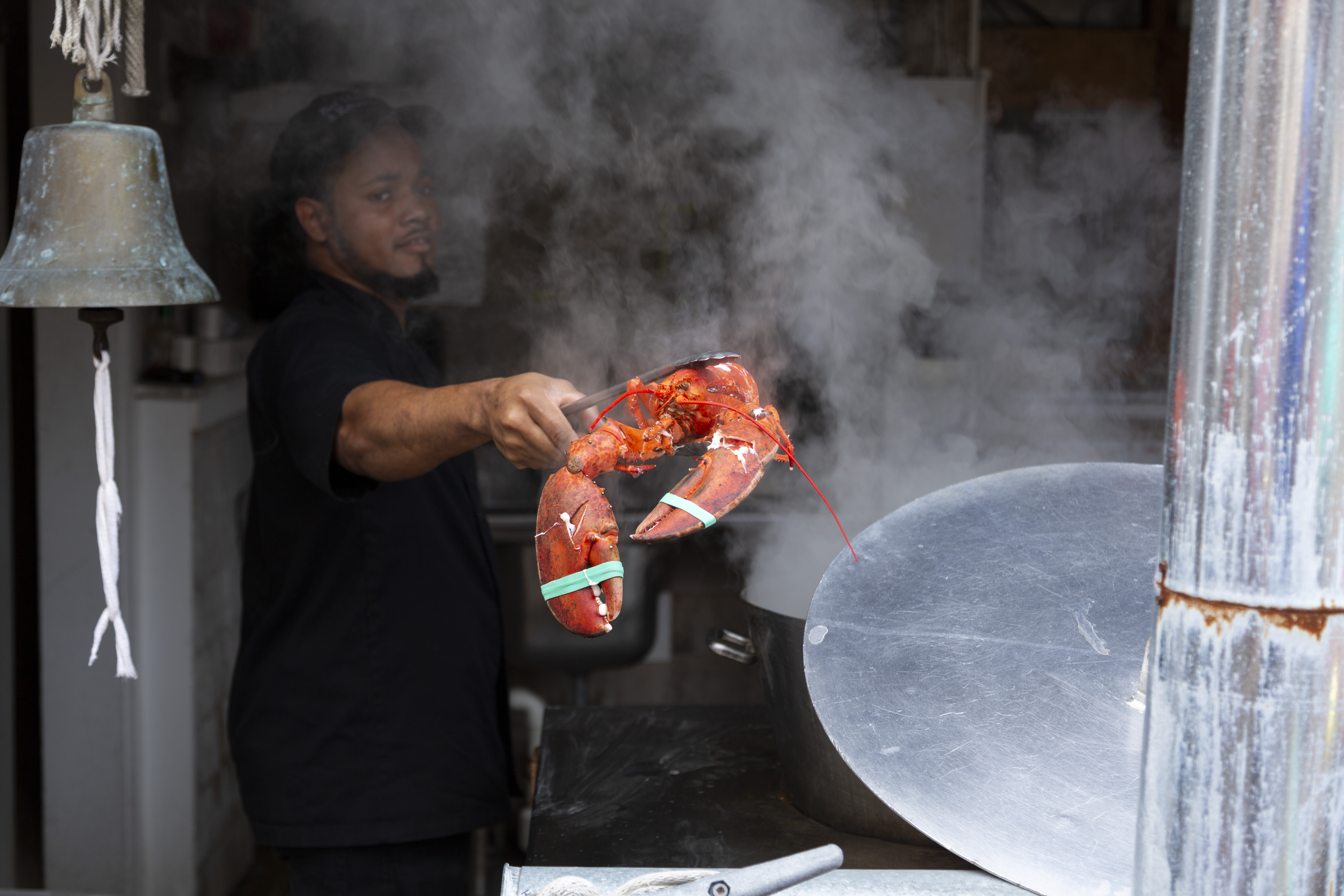
A lobster with its claws bound after being boiled alive

The Homarus lobster is usually cooked alive. The Animal Welfare (Sentience) Act 2022 covers all vertebrates and some invertebrates such as octopuses and lobsters.

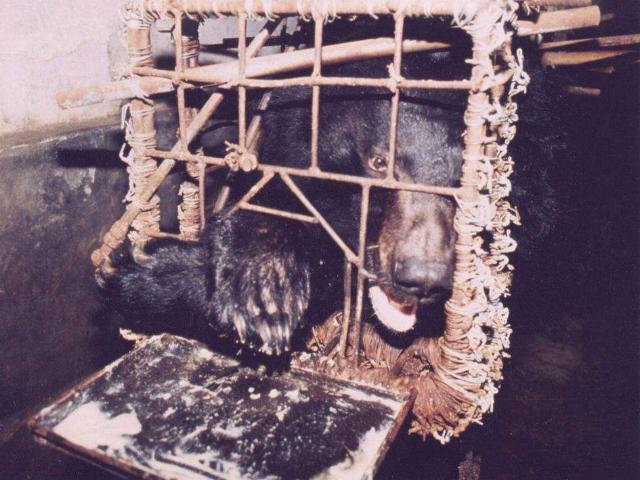
A bile bear in a "crush cage" on Huizhou Farm, Huizhou, China

Bile bears, sometimes called battery bears, are bears kept in captivity to harvest their bile, a digestive fluid produced by the liver and stored in the gallbladder, which is used by some traditional Asian medicine practitioners. It is estimated that 12,000 bears are farmed for bile in China, South Korea, Laos, Vietnam, and Myanmar. Demand for the bile has been found in those nations as well as in some others, such as Malaysia and Japan.

Kopi luwak, also known as civet coffee, is a coffee that consists of partially digested coffee cherries, which have been eaten and defecated by the Asian palm civet (Paradoxurus hermaphroditus). The cherries are fermented as they pass through a civet's intestines, and after being defecated with other fecal matter, they are collected. Asian palm civets are increasingly caught in the wild and traded for this purpose. Growing numbers of intensive civet "farms" have been established and are operated in Southeast Asia, confining tens of thousands of animals to live in battery cages and be force-fed.

Habushu (ハブ酒) is an awamori-based liqueur made in Okinawa, Japan. Other common names include habu sake or Okinawan snake wine. Habushu is named after the habu snake, Protobothrops flavoviridis, which belongs to the pit viper subfamily of vipers, and is closely related to the rattlesnake and copperhead. There are two methods of inserting the snake into the alcohol. The maker may choose to simply submerge the snake in the alcohol and seal the bottle, thus drowning the snake. Alternatively, the snake may be put on ice until it passes out, at which point it is gutted, bled and sewn up. When the viper is thawed and awakens, it will quickly die in an aggressive striking manner, which is what most producers look for. The manufacturer will then put the Habu in an ethanol bath for a month to preserve it.

Alfred Brehm wrote the following about the capture of sea turtles in the 19th century:

The poor sea turtles are terribly tortured in the island of Ceylon. The buyers probably want to buy fresh meat, or the sellers don't want to bother with the slaughter, so they simply pull off the breastplate of the live animal and the buyer is cut the piece of meat he wants. And then the European is horrified to see the slow yawning and beating of the heart of the extremely hardy, half-skinned animal, whose organ is usually sold last.

==== Eating live animals ====
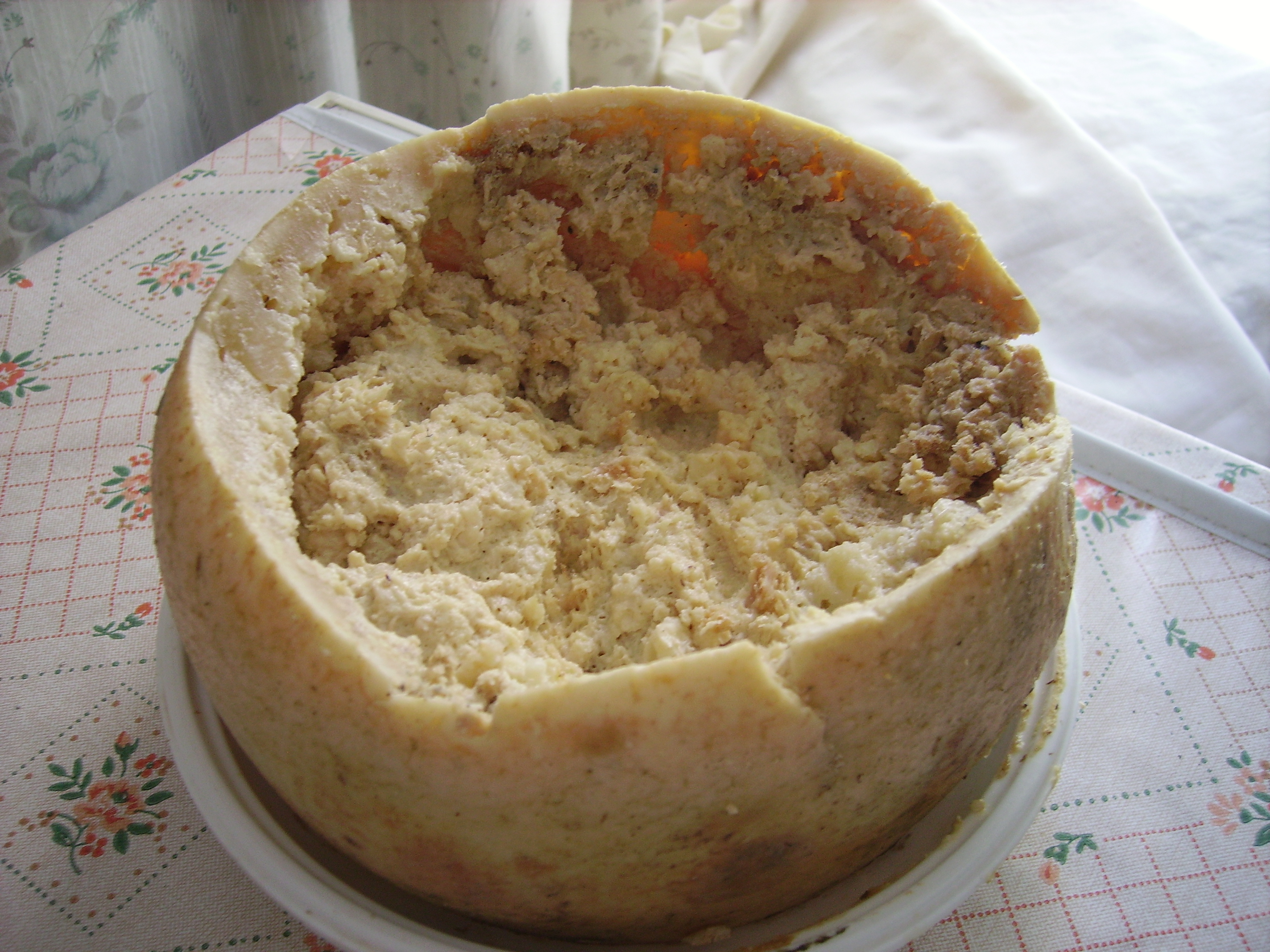
Casu marzu, a traditional Sardinian sheep milk cheese that contains insect larvae

Eating live animals is a practice found in various cultures around the world, often considered a delicacy or traditional food. However, this practice may be considered cruel, as eating live animals or parts of live animals can cause significant suffering and distress, and is even unlawful in certain jurisdictions under animal cruelty laws.

Eating live seafood in Japanese cuisine includes practices such as ikizukuri (freshly killed and arranged to appear alive), and odorigui (seafood eaten while still moving), including odori ebi ("dancing shrimp"). All are controversial for animal welfare reasons.

One example of eating live larvae is the witchetty grub of Aboriginal Australian cuisine, which can be eaten alive and raw or cooked.

==== Highly intelligent animals ====
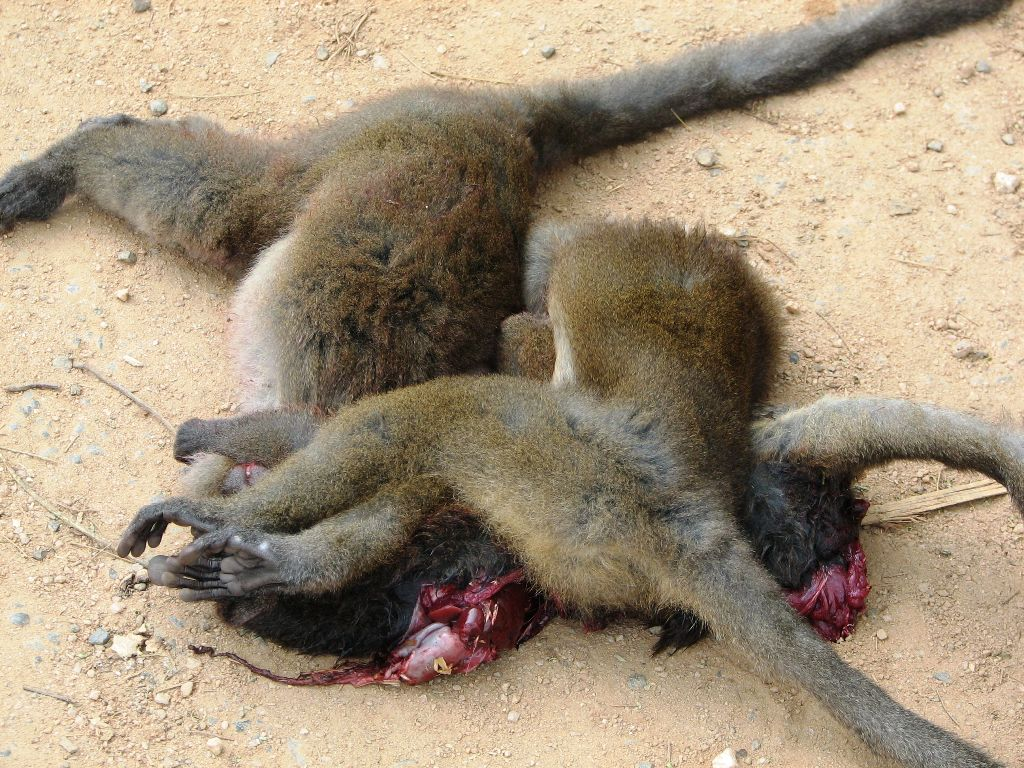
Eastern lesser bamboo lemurs (Hapalemur griseus) killed in northeast Madagascar for bushmeat

Primate cognition encompasses a wide range of advanced intellectual and behavioral skills, including problem-solving, tool use, social learning, cooperation, and even cultural transmission. Monkey meat is the flesh and other edible parts derived from monkeys, a kind of bushmeat. Human consumption of monkey meat has been historically recorded in numerous parts of the world, including multiple Asian and African nations. Monkey meat consumption has been reported in parts of Europe and the Americas as well. Monkey brains is a supposed dish consisting of, at least, partially, the brain of some species of monkey or ape.

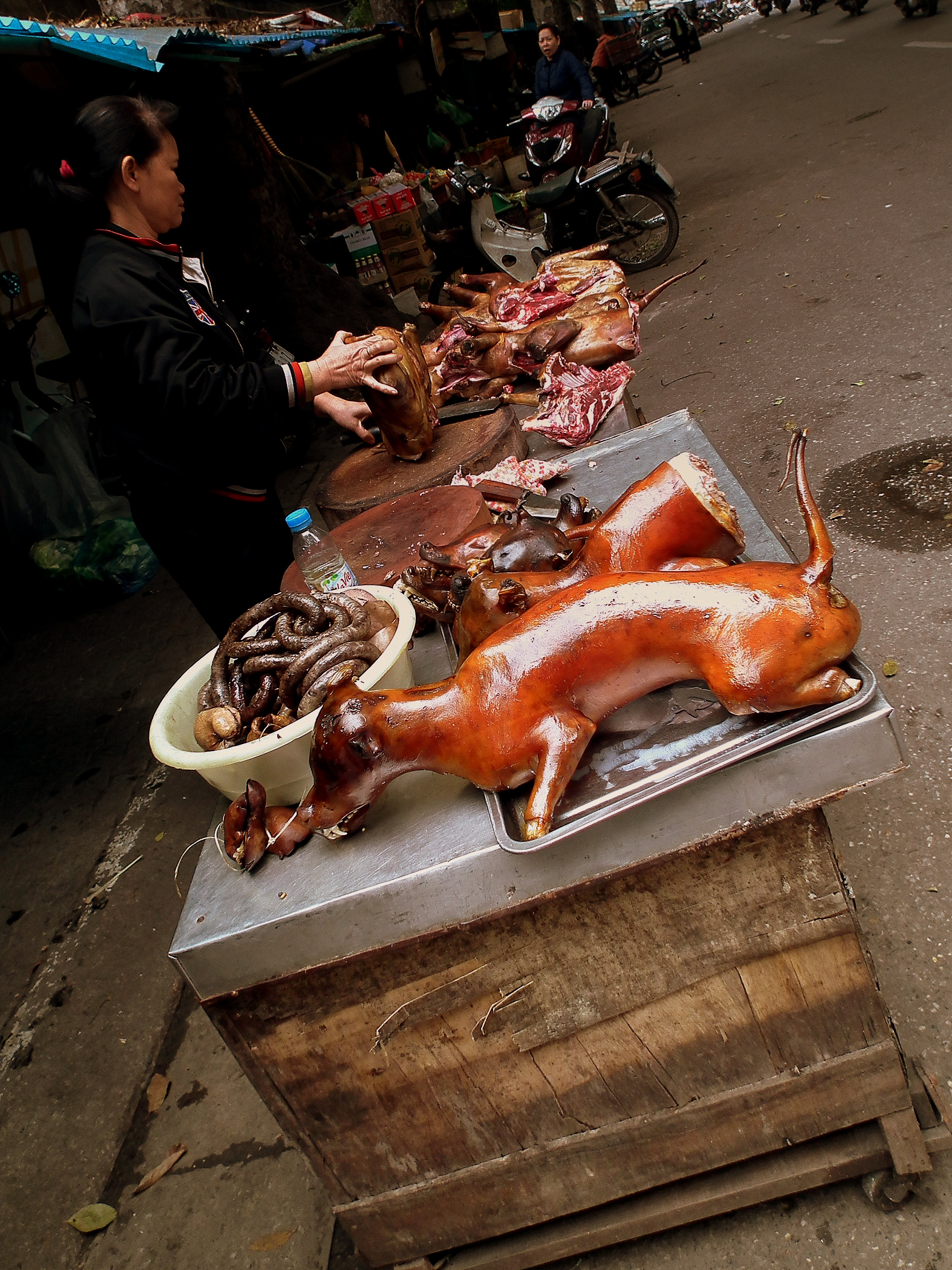
Dog meat for sale in a market in Hanoi, Vietnam

Dog intelligence is widely recognized, with dogs demonstrating advanced problem-solving, emotional sensitivity, and strong social bonds. Dog meat consumption, particularly in Vietnam, has been criticized and condemned by many both within the country and internationally, as most of the dogs are pets that were kidnapped and slaughtered in brutal ways, usually by bludgeoning, stabbing, burning alive, or throat-slitting.

Cat intelligence is well-documented, with domestic cats exhibiting complex social behaviors, problem-solving skills, and the ability to form strong bonds with humans. Cat meat is meat prepared from domestic cats for human consumption. Some countries serve cat meat as a regular food, whereas others have only consumed some cat meat in desperation during wartime, famine or poverty. As cat ownership grew in China, opposition to cat meat increased. In 2006, activists forced a Shenzhen restaurant to stop selling cat meat, two years after the Chinese Animal Protection Network (CAPN) began organizing protests against dog and cat meat in multiple cities. CAPN's efforts helped raise awareness and reduce demand. In 2020, Four Paws and Change For Animals urged Vietnam to reinstate bans on the cat meat trade, highlighting ongoing regional concerns.

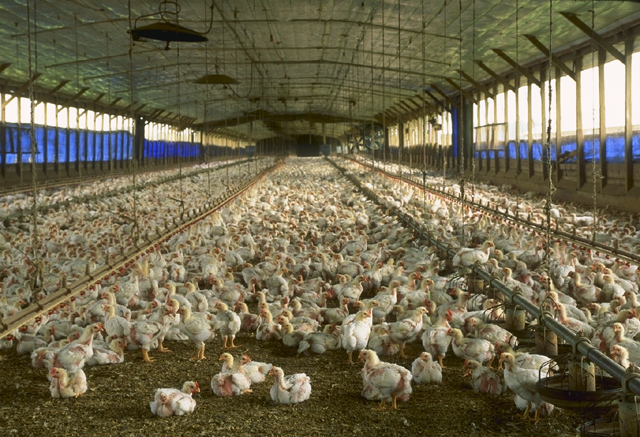
A commercial chicken house with open sides raising broiler pullets for meat

Bird intelligence is remarkable, with ducks and chickens showing advanced abilities. Bird brains have two-to-four times the neuron packing density of mammal brains, for higher overall efficiency. Despite this, both are widely used as food and often face cruel conditions in factory farming, raising serious ethical concerns about animal cruelty. Additionally, practices such as duck-baiting highlight a long legacy of animal exploitation.

According to some news reports, buntings were blinded before cooking. (Note: The use of the bird as food is now prohibited.)

Pig intelligence is among the highest in the mammal world; pigs display a wide range of complex behaviors, like being able to play video games, understanding human instructions and even using tools. Despite this high level of intelligence and emotional sensitivity, pigs are frequently subjected to animal cruelty—such as being forced to participate in pig wrestling events, confined in cramped factory farms, or neglected—which causes them unnecessary stress, pain, and suffering.

Equine intelligence is increasingly recognized, with recent studies showing that horses possess advanced cognitive abilities such as strategic thinking, problem-solving, and model-based learning—skills once thought to be beyond their capacity. Horse slaughter is the practice of slaughtering horses to produce meat for consumption. Humans have long consumed horse meat; the oldest known cave art, the 30,000-year-old paintings in France's Chauvet Cave, depict horses with other wild animals hunted by humans. Equine domestication is believed to have begun to raise horses for human consumption. The practice has become controversial in some parts of the world due to several concerns: whether horses are (or can be) managed humanely in industrial slaughter; whether horses not raised for consumption yield safe meat, and whether it is appropriate to consume what some view as a companion animal.

Eating octopus, is considered cruel by many due to cephalopod intelligence, as octopuses demonstrate advanced problem-solving skills and self-awareness. There is currently no validated humane method of slaughter for octopuses, as their nervous system isn't centralized.

Ethical concerns arise with eating dolphins because of cetacean intelligence, with dolphins exhibiting complex social behaviors, language comprehension, and a high degree of self-recognition. Dolphin drive hunting, a practice involving the herding and killing of dolphins, intensifies these ethical issues.

=== Cultural rituals ===
Many times, when Asiatic elephants are captured in Thailand, handlers use a technique known as the training crush, in which "handlers use sleep-deprivation, hunger, and thirst to 'break' the elephants' spirit and make them submissive to their owners"; moreover, handlers drive nails into the elephants' ears and feet.

In Kerala, India, captive elephants are sometimes subjected to a practice known as ketti azhikkal, in which the animal's four legs are chained to trees or posts and it is beaten with rods, sticks, and hooks, historically to reassert control over a bull elephant emerging from musth or to transfer its obedience to a new mahout. Elephants subjected to the practice are sometimes killed or fatally injured by it. In November 2024, the Kerala High Court, acting on a suo motu public interest litigation regarding captive elephants in the state, issued extensive directions for their protection, describing the life of a captive elephant in Kerala as an "Eternal Treblinka".

The practice of cruelty to animals for divination purposes is found in ancient cultures, and some modern religions such as Santeria continue to do animal sacrifices for healing and other rituals. Taghairm was performed by ancient Scots to summon devils.

An investigation by the Animal Welfare Board of India concluded that "jallikattu is inherently cruel to animals".

Jallikattu, also known as Eru Taḻuvuṭal and Manju-virattu, is a traditional event in which a zebu bull (Bos indicus), such as the Pulikulam or Kangayam breeds, is released into a crowd of people, and many people attempt to grab the large hump on the bull's back with both arms and hang on to it while the bull attempts to escape. Animal welfare organisations such as the Federation of Indian Animal Protection Organisations (FIAPO) and PETA India have protested against the practice.

The Kambala, Kambla or Kambula is an annual buffalo race held in the southwestern Indian state of Karnataka. It is similar to maramadi from Kerala Traditionally, it is sponsored by local Tuluva landlords and households in the coastal districts of Dakshina Kannada, Udupi and Bhatkal of Karnataka and Kasaragod of Kerala, a region collectively known as Tulu Nadu. Many have criticised Kambala as cruel to the racing buffaloes, which are driven by whips. Noted animal-rights activist Maneka Gandhi expressed concerns about the ill treatment of buffaloes during the race. While Kambala organizers contend that whips are necessary to elicit maximum speed, government officials advise the riders to be gentle on buffaloes and avoid using whips during the race.

=== Declawing ===
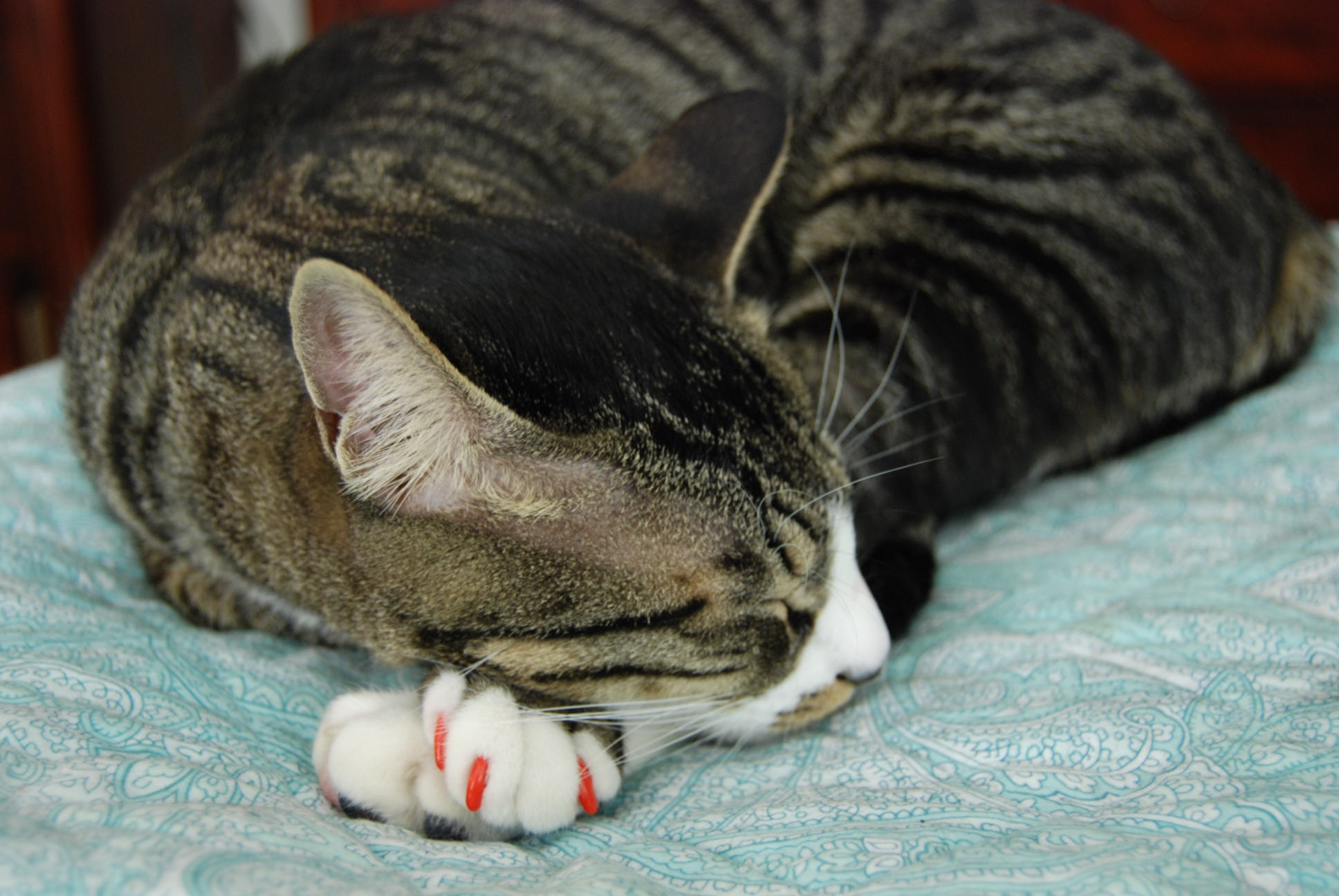
Cat with red nail caps

Onychectomy, popularly known as declawing, is an operation to remove an animal's claws surgically by means of the amputation of all or part of the distal phalanges, or end bones, of the animal's toes.

Declawing of crabs is the process whereby one or both claws of a crab are manually detached before the return of the live crab to the water, as practiced in the fishing industry worldwide. Crabs commonly have the ability to regenerate lost limbs after a period of time, and thus declawing is viewed as a potentially more sustainable method of fishing. Due to the time it takes for a crab to regrow lost limbs, however, whether or not the practice represents truly sustainable fishing is still a point of scientific inquiry, and the ethics of declawing are also subject to debates over pain in crustaceans.

=== Entertainment ===
Spain has a number of festivals that involve some sort of animal cruelty. Among them are burning the bull, donkey baiting, shaving of the beasts (Galicia), garrotting the galgos, quail catapulting, Day of the Geese, running of the bulls, and bull fighting.

==== Animal fighting ====
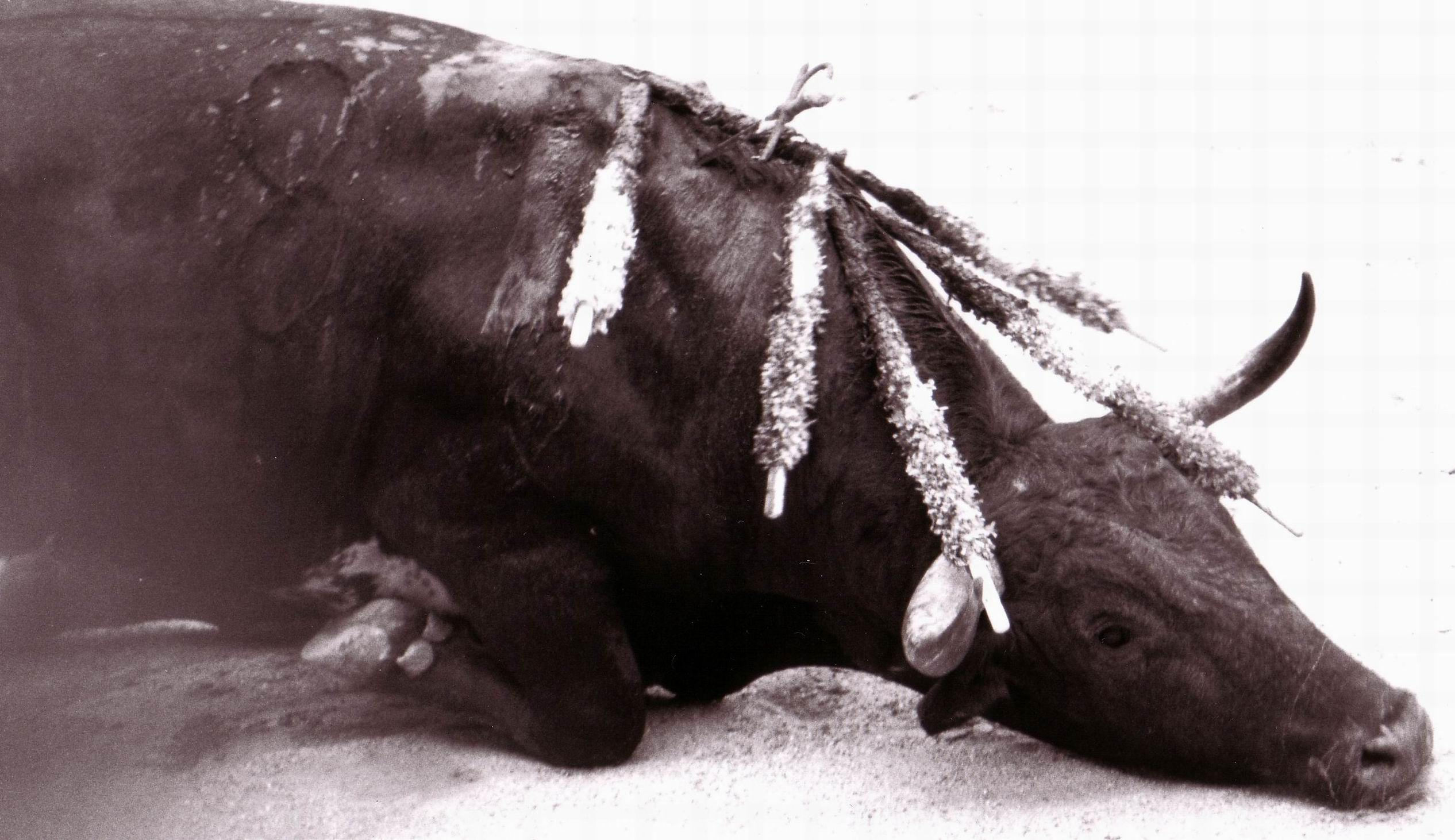
A bull dying in a bullfight

Bullfighting is criticized by animal rights or animal welfare activists, referring to it as a cruel or barbaric blood sport in which the bull suffers severe stress and slow, torturous death. Several activist groups undertake anti-bullfighting actions in Spain and other countries. In Spain, opponents of bullfighting are referred to as anti-taurinos.

The Bulletpoint Bullfight warns that bullfighting is "not for the squeamish", advising spectators to "be prepared for blood". It details prolonged and profuse bleeding caused by horse-mounted lancers, the charging by the bull of a blindfolded, armored horse who is "sometimes doped up, and unaware of the proximity of the bull", the placing of barbed darts by banderilleros, followed by the matador's fatal sword thrust. It stresses that these procedures are a normal part of bullfighting and that death is rarely instantaneous. It further warns those attending bullfights to "be prepared to witness various failed attempts at killing the animal before it lies down."

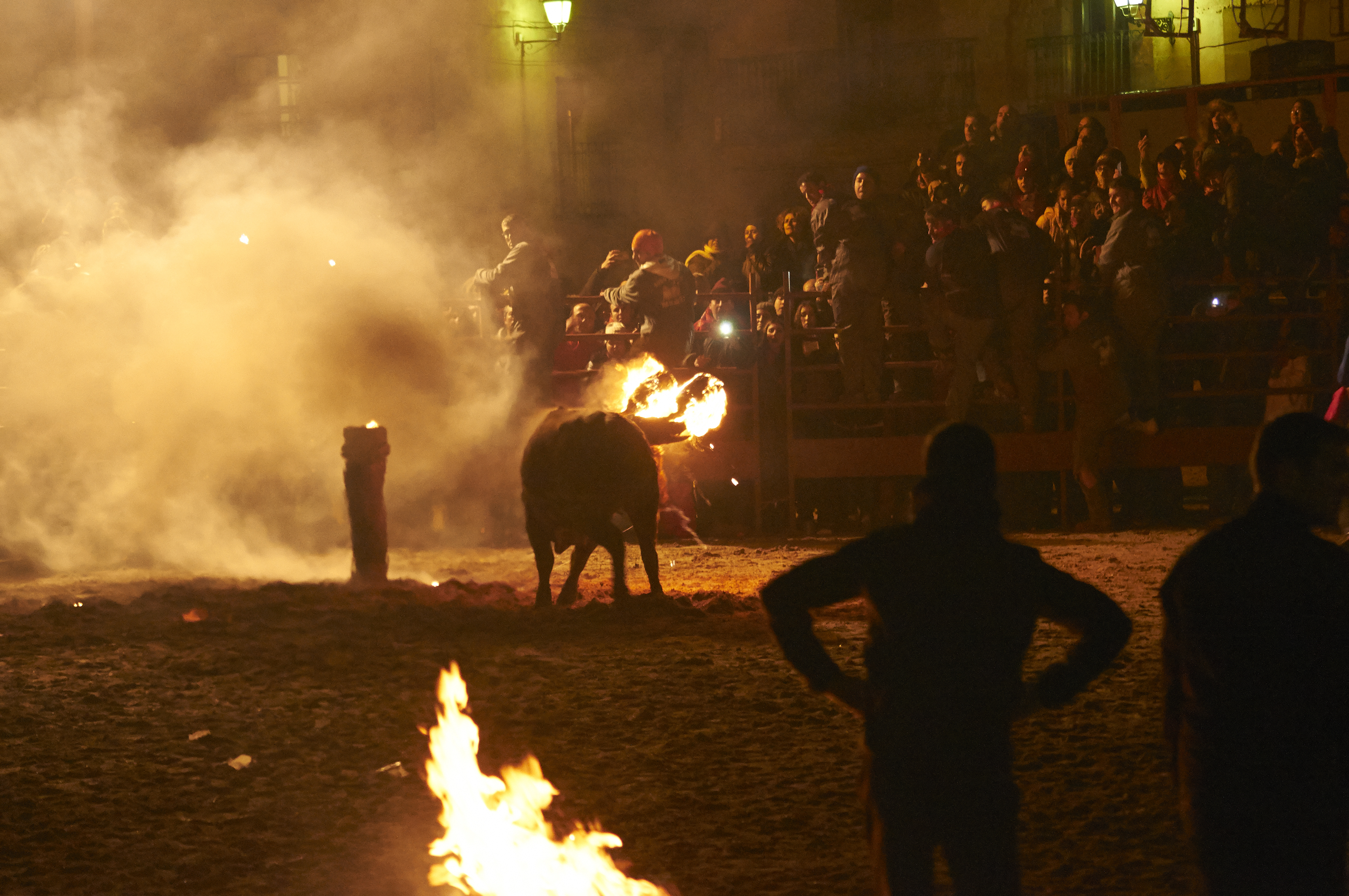
The Toro Jubilo, Madrid, 2014

The "Toro Jubilo" or Toro embolado in Soria, Medinaceli, Spain, is a festival associated with animal cruelty. During this festival, balls of pitch are attached to a bull's horns and set on fire. The bull is then released into the streets and will run around in pain, often smashing into walls in an attempt to douse the fire as spectators attempt to dodge the animal. The pitch balls can burn for hours, and they burn the bull's horns, body, and eyes. The animal rights group PACMA has described the fiesta as "a clear example of animal mistreatment".

Dog fighting is a sport that turns dogs against one another in a ring or a pit for gambling or the entertainment of the spectators. Dogs are often bred and selected for gameness, a trait that refers to their willingness to continue fighting despite injury or exhaustion, which further intensifies the cruelty of these events.

Cockfighting is a blood sport involving domesticated roosters as the combatants.

Donkey-baiting is a blood sport involving the baiting of donkeys against dogs.

An elephant execution, sometimes called elephant lynching, is a pseudo-legal or performative public spectacle where a captive elephant is killed in order to punish it for being a "bad elephant" (behaviors that had, threatened, injured, or killed humans).

Ram fighting is a blood sport between two rams (large-horned male sheep), held in a ring or open field. It is commonly found in sheep or goat husbandry culture in Africa, Asia and Europe. In Nigeria, Uzbekistan and Indonesia, ram fighting gains popularity among locals. Although categorized as a blood sport and an act of animal cruelty, ram fights rarely resulted in the death of the defeated ram, as the loser often is allowed to flee the arena.

===== Baiting =====
Baiting, including badger-baiting, bear-baiting, bull-baiting, duck-baiting, hyena-baiting, rat-baiting, or wolf-baiting refers to blood sports in which animals are provoked or attacked by dogs for entertainment, often resulting in significant suffering and injury, and are now widely condemned as forms of animal cruelty.

==== Animals in professional wrestling ====
The usage of animals in professional wrestling has varied through the profession's history. Animals that have been used as opponents to humans in matches include pig wrestling, bears, tigers, cheetahs and orangutans.

The use of animals in professional wrestling, particularly in acts such as bear wrestling or involving wild animals as performers, is widely regarded as animal cruelty. These practices often subject animals to stressful, unnatural, and dangerous situations, sometimes resulting in injury, neglect, or death. Historical examples include, chained, declawed and muzzled bears forced to wrestle humans, as well as the use of snakes, tigers, and other wild animals in matches or as props. Such uses have been criticized for exploiting animals for entertainment, and bear wrestling is now illegal in many jurisdictions.

==== Chilean rodeo ====
Chilean rodeo is generally considered more cruel than common (North American) rodeo by animal welfare organizations and critics, primarily due to differences in how calves are treated and the lack of protective regulations. Animal rights organizations reject calling Chilean rodeo a sport, objecting to the treatment of animals—especially calves, which are repeatedly charged against a wall by horses for points. While supporters claim injuries are rare and animals are inspected, activists argue the events cause psychological and physical trauma. Protests have occurred, with some met by violence, and calls to ban rodeo have grown, similar to movements against bullfighting in Spain.

==== Rattlesnake round-ups ====
Rattlesnake round-ups, also known as rattlesnake rodeos, are annual events common in the rural Midwest and Southern United States, where the primary attractions are captured wild rattlesnakes which are sold, displayed, killed for food or animal products (such as snakeskin) or released back into the wild. The largest rattlesnake round-up in the United States is held in Sweetwater, Texas. Held every year since 1958, the event currently attracts approximately 30,000 visitors per year and in 2006 each annual round-up was said to result in the capture of 1% of the state's rattlesnake population. Rattlesnake round-ups became a concern by animal welfare groups and conservationists due to claims of animal cruelty. In response, some round-ups impose catch-size restrictions or releasing captured snakes back into the wild.

==== Circuses ====
Worldwide laws on animal use in circuses: Nationwide ban / Partial or local bans (Note: Certain animals are excluded or the laws vary internally.); Ban on import/export / No ban; Unknown

The use of animals in the circus has been controversial since animal welfare groups have documented instances of animal cruelty during the training of performing animals. Animal abuse in circuses has been documented such as keeping them in small enclosures, lack of veterinary care, abusive training methods, and lack of oversight by regulating bodies. Animal trainers have argued that some criticism is not based on fact, including beliefs that shouting makes the animals believe the trainer is going to hurt them, that caging is cruel and common, and that the use of whips, chains or training harms animals.

Bolivia has enacted what animal rights activists called the world's first ban on all animals in circuses.

==== Media ====
===== Internet videos =====
Cruelty to animals has often been filmed on video and uploaded to social media websites or private Internet groups. This may involve large-scale, systematic operations; a notable example of this was a global monkey torture ring uncovered by the BBC in June 2023, where participants would produce and distribute videos of monkeys being hurt and killed. Individuals who have published animal cruelty content include Luka Magnotta, a Canadian murderer who uploaded YouTube videos of himself torturing and killing cats; Rubén Marrero Pernas, a man in Cuba who was found to be raping, torturing then killing dogs and recording the acts online for an audience; and Leighton Labute, a Canadian man who was arrested in 2020 for torturing and killing three hamsters, and uploading the video to social media.

The video-sharing site YouTube has been criticized for hosting thousands of videos of real-life animal cruelty, especially the feeding of one animal to another for entertainment and spectacle. Although some of these videos have been flagged as inappropriate by users, YouTube has generally declined to remove them, unlike videos that include copyright infringement. In 2021, YouTube banned staged animal rescue videos, where animals were purposely put in danger before being saved.

According to a news article published on January 11, 2026, in the culture section of Index, videos circulating on social media that show the "rescue" of frozen animals may pose real dangers, as animals can be deliberately exposed to extreme cold, placed in icy water or on frozen surfaces, and subjected to unprofessional rescue methods—such as striking ice, rough handling, or rapid warming—causing severe suffering or even death.

===== Television and filmmaking =====
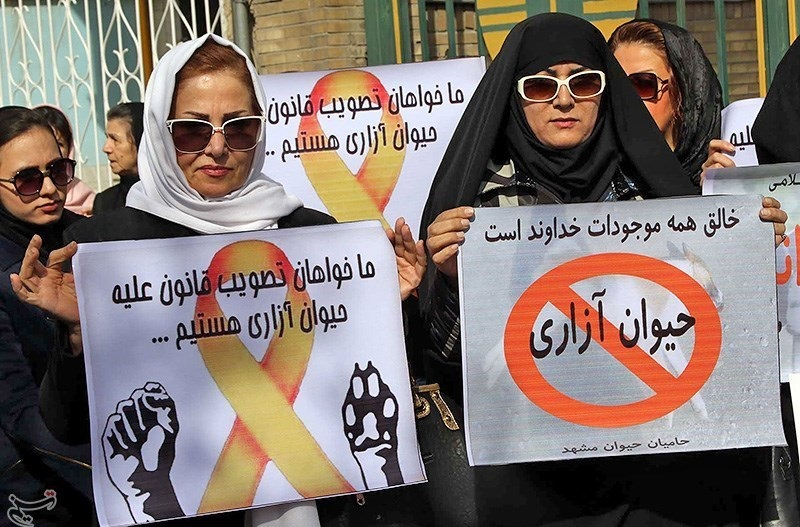
Demonstrations against animal cruelty in Iran

Animal cruelty has long been an issue in filmmaking industry, with even some big-budget Hollywood films receiving criticism for allegedly harmful—and sometimes lethal—treatment of animals during production. Court decisions have addressed films that harm animals such as videos that in part depict dog fighting. Currently, there is no federal or state law specifically governing the use of animals in filmed media, though the federal Animal Welfare Act (AWA) and state cruelty laws indirectly apply.

Luis Buñuel's pseudo-documentary Land Without Bread (1933) depicts Spain in the 1930s. In one scene, wealthy people shoot a goat (for fun), and in another, they smear honey on a sick donkey so that bees can sting it to death.

The American Humane Association (AHA) has been associated with monitoring American film-making since the release of the film Jesse James (1939), in which a horse was pushed off a plank and drowned in a body of water after having fallen 40 feet into it. Initially, monitoring of animal cruelty was a partnership between the AHA and the Motion Picture Producers and Distributors of America (also called the Hays office) through the Motion Picture Production Code. Provisions in the code discouraged "apparent cruelty to children and animals", and because the Hays Office had the power to enforce this clause, the AHA often had access to sets to assess adherence to it. However, because the AHA's Hollywood office depended on the Hays Office for the right to monitor sets, the closure of the Hays Office in 1966 corresponded with an increase in animal cruelty on movie sets.

In the famous and now classic science fiction film, The Incredible Shrinking Man (1957), a grown man shrinks to a tiny size and fights a house spider. The film used large live tarantulas (trickily solved by filming the man), 24 of which died during filming due to the intense heat and bright lights. By 1977, a three-year contract was in place between the Screen Actors Guild (SAG) and the American Federation of Television and Radio Artists which specified that the AHA should be "consulted in the use of animals 'when appropriate'", but the contract did not provide a structure for what "appropriate" meant, and had no enforcement powers. This contract expired in 1980.

One of the most infamous examples of animal cruelty in the film was Michael Cimino's flop Heaven's Gate (1980), in which numerous animals were brutalized and even killed during production. Cimino allegedly killed chickens and bled horses from the neck to gather samples of their blood to smear on actors for Heaven's Gate, and also allegedly had a horse blown up with dynamite while shooting a battle sequence, the shot of which made it into the film. This film played a large part in renewed scrutiny of animal cruelty in films and led to renewed official on-set jurisdiction to monitor the treatment of animals by the AHA in 1980. In the 1969 film "Fando and Lis", there is a scene where director Jodorowsky slits the throats of live geese.

After the release of the film Reds (1981), the star and director of the picture, Warren Beatty apologized for his Spanish film crew's use of tripwires on horses while filming a battle scene, when Beatty was not present. Tripwires were used against horses when Rambo III (1988) and The 13th Warrior (1999) were being filmed. A water buffalo was sliced nearly in half during the production of Apocalypse Now (1979), while a donkey was bled to death for dramatic effect for the Danish film Manderlay (2005), in a scene later deleted from the film.

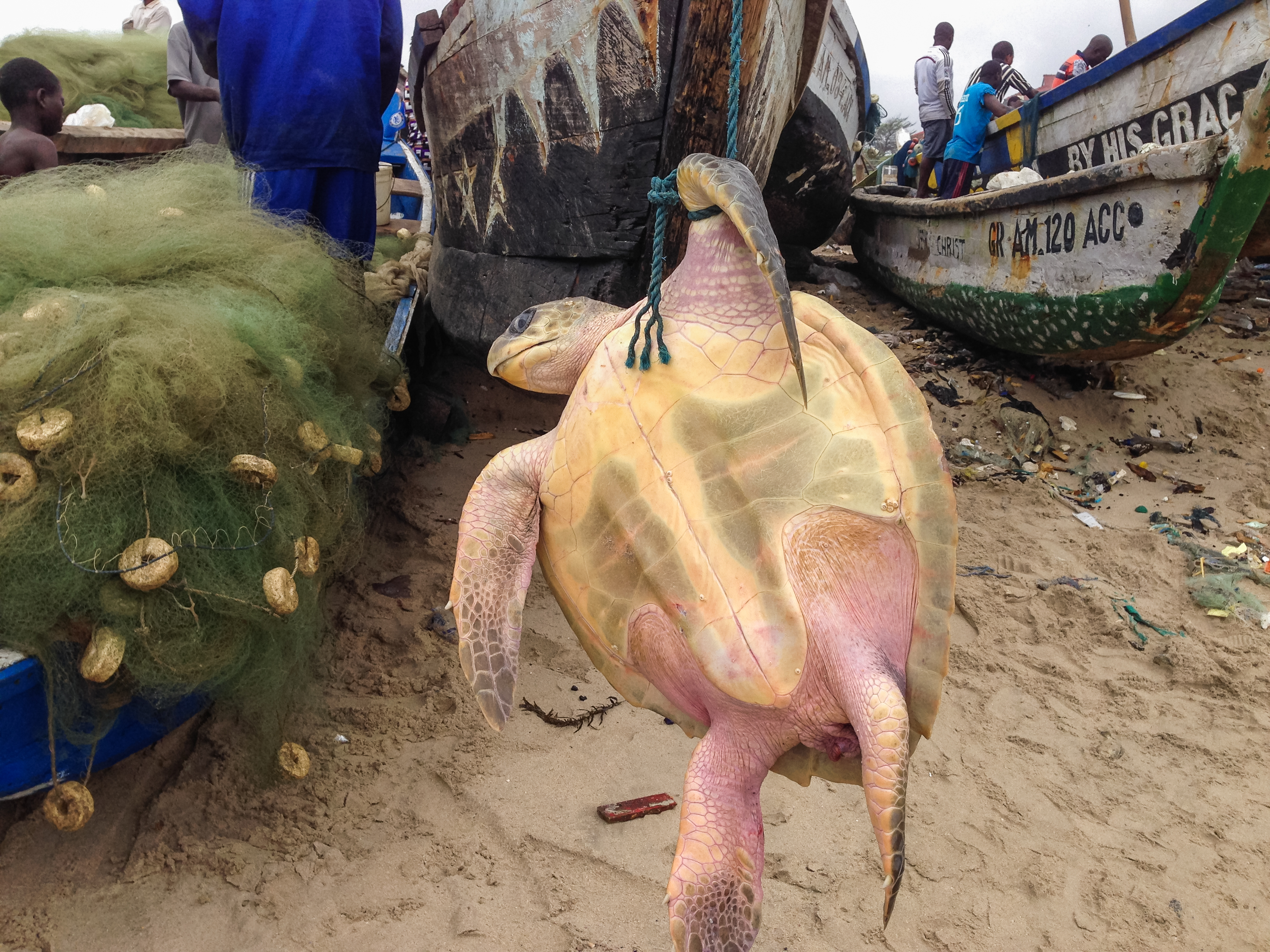
Captured sea turtle at Jamestown, Accra, Ghana

There is a case of cruelty to animals in the South Korean film The Isle (2000), according to its director Kim Ki-Duk. In the film, a real frog is skinned alive while fish are mutilated. Seven animals were killed for the camera in the controversial Italian film Cannibal Holocaust (1980). The images in the film include the slow and graphic beheading and ripping apart of a turtle, a monkey being beheaded and its brains being consumed by natives and a spider being chopped apart. Cannibal Holocaust was only one film in a collective of similarly themed movies (cannibal films) that featured unstaged animal cruelty. Their influences were rooted in the films of Mondo filmmakers, which sometimes contained similar content. In several countries, Cannibal Holocaust was banned or allowed for release with most of the animal cruelty edited out.

In the Hungarian Judit Elek's film Memories of a River (1990), 14 sheep were burned alive. A horse was allegedly killed on the set of Andrzej Wajda's film The Ashes (1965). Animals were also killed in other Hungarian films. In the film Sons of the Stone-Hearted Man (1965), wolves were shot dead with a shotgun, and one was even stabbed. In Lutra (1985), the fox and the wild boar were also shot. From Lily of the Valley to Fall Foliage (1952) also contains real hunting scenes – as does Twelve Months in the Woods (1989–1990).

In the film Fort Tilden (2014), the main characters find kittens in a trash can and – although they initially wanted to save them - end up leaving them there. In Al sur del edén (1984), a female character lies on her bed and rubs a live canary against her genitals for sexual gratification. (Only the woman's legs are shown from the side, the scene may not be real, and she only holds the bird between her legs.) In the film Malèna (2000), young boys burn ants to death on the beach with torches. In Anatomy of Hell (2004), a little boy throws a live baby bird to the ground.

Slaughterhouse animals being butchered are shown in the 1949 French film Blood of the Beasts (pigs) and in the 1963 Hungarian film Elégia (horses). It is unclear whether a pig is killed in the Hungarian film Taxidermia (2006). Slaughterhouse scenes as well as the trampling of frogs were shown in the Korean film Mago (2002), and an (allegedly dying) kitten is drowned in the Hungarian film Hypocritical (2006).

In the film The Reflecting Skin (1990), children torture a frog. In the film The Lighthouse (2019), a seagull opens its beak in a cistern, and then another is beaten to death by a lighthouse keeper who goes mad. The seagull was not actually killed during filming. „The production team has emphasized that no seagulls were harmed during the filming. Scenes involving the killing of seagulls ... were created using animatronics and then enhanced through digital post‑production."

Vase de Noces contains scenes of extreme violence and sexual perversion against animals; the film has been banned in several places.

The SAG has contracted with the AHA for monitoring animal use during filming or while on the set. Compliance with this arrangement is voluntary and only applies to films made in the United States. Films monitored by the American Humane Association may bear one of their end-credit messages. Many productions, including those made in the United States, do not advise AHA or SAG of animal use in films, so there is no oversight. In order to get the end credit disclaimer, productions must register with American Humane and engage an AHA Certified Animal Safety Representative who monitors animal acting throughout production and must follow the guidelines for animal safety are important, however, not all films are required to use the "No Animals Were Harmed" disclaimer, and they can choose to film without American Humane monitoring, and others may include cost or logistical reasons, including animals with smaller roles.

Some other animal welfare organizations worldwide, such as the Animal Anti-Cruelty League in South Africa, have also monitored the use of animals in the film. Depending on the country, like Japan, due to different cultural and industry-standard crediting practices in the Japanese film industry which has different, often less stringent, internal standards for such public recognition in the credits and traditionally have less detailed animal welfare documentation in the credits compared to Hollywood productions. The on-set management of animal welfare in the Japanese film is often an internal production matter or handled by registered animal handling businesses, rather than a publicly monitored and credited one. The responsibility ultimately rests with the producer or their representative. Similarly, animals with very small roles which might not warrant a dedicated, prominent credit in the Japanese system.

==== Documentary films ====
The documentaries Zoo (2007) and Donkey Love (2012) examined serious sexual perversions directed at animals. The former explored a North American history of horse fornication, while the latter explored a "folk practice" among rural Columbian peasants, where religious village men would satisfy their sexual desires with donkeys instead of women (as a way of desecrating women or to preserve their virginity before marriage).

==== Zoos and aquariums ====
Zoos and aquariums can be considered a form of animal cruelty when the conditions of captivity negatively impact the physical and psychological well-being of the animals.

Roadside zoos are found throughout North America, particularly in remote locations. They are often small, for-profit zoos, often intended to attract visitors to some other facility, such as a gas station. The animals may be trained to perform tricks, and visitors are able to get closer to them than in larger zoos. Since they are sometimes less regulated, roadside zoos are often subject to accusations of neglect and cruelty.

=== Fur farming ===
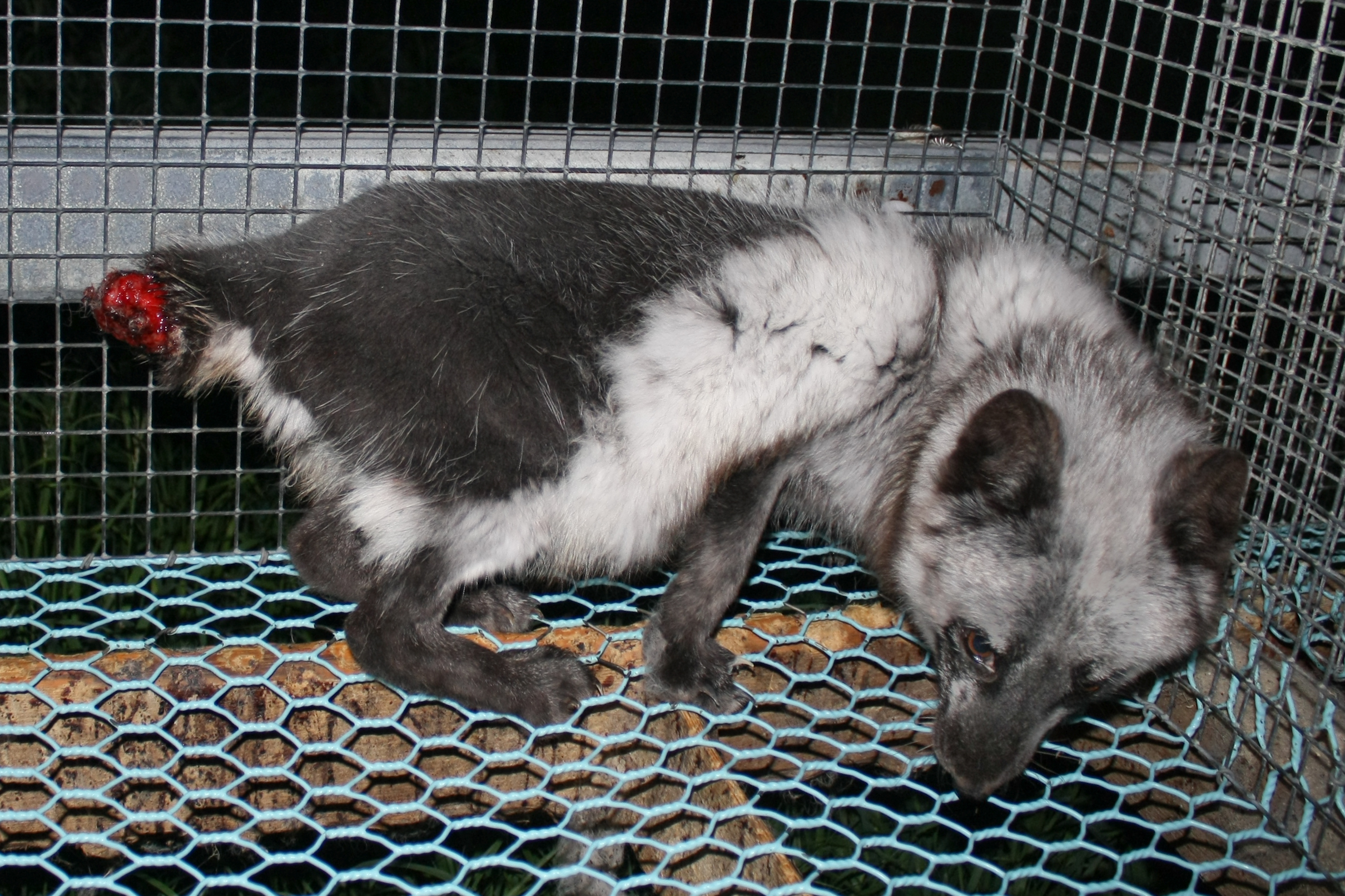
A fox with dismembered tail in a fur farm cage

Animal welfare activists suggest a total ban on fur production due to the suffering inflicted on animals, especially minks. It has been suggested that fur production is immoral as fur clothes are luxury items. Minks are solitary and territorial animals; however, in fur farms, they are raised in cages and skinned after being killed either by breaking their necks or using lethal gas.

=== Hoarding and breeding ===
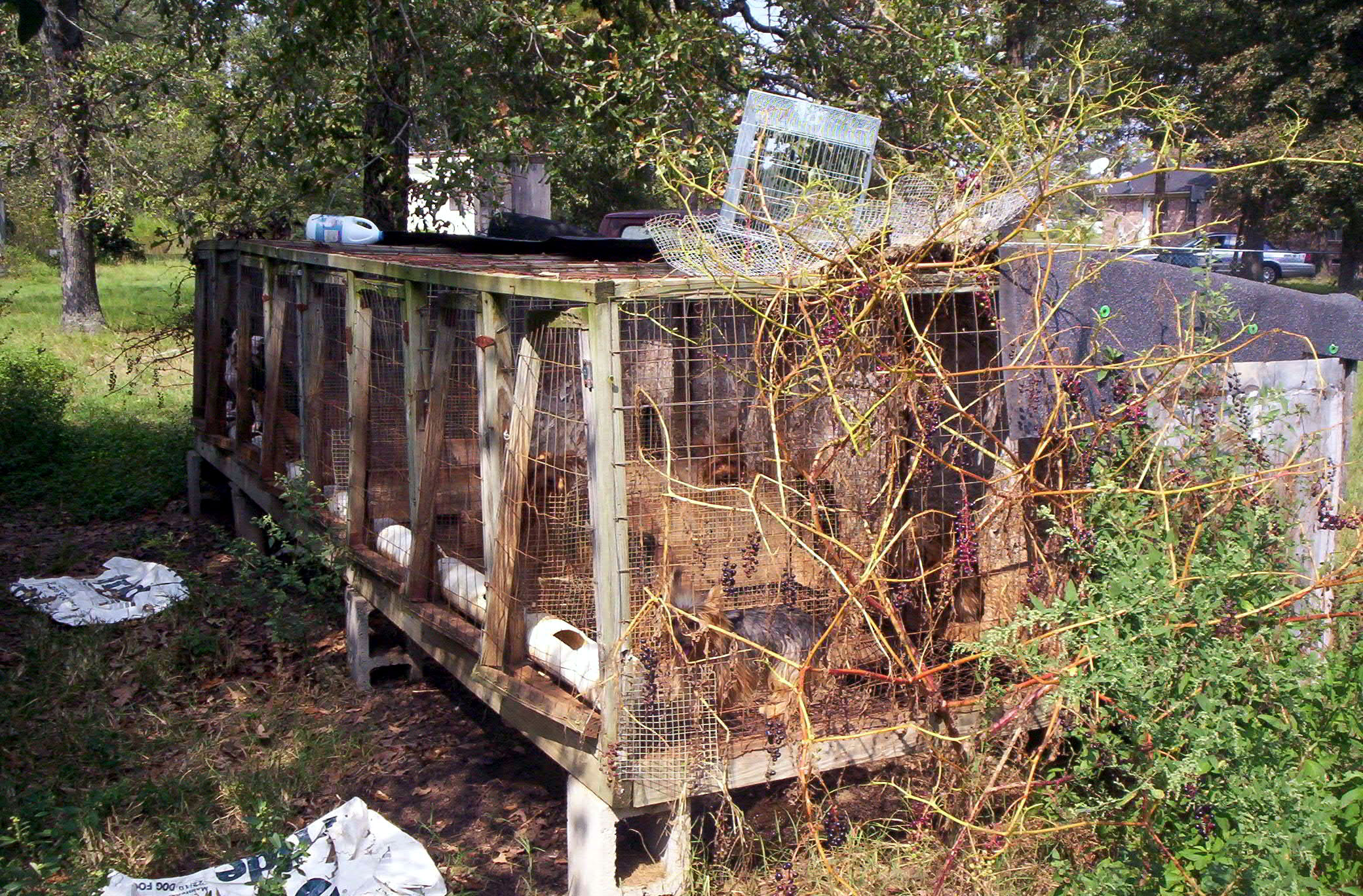
A puppy mill in the rural United States

Animal hoarding involves keeping more animals than can be properly cared for, often resulting in neglect and poor living conditions. Similarly, a puppy mill is a commercial breeding facility where dogs are kept in overcrowded, inhumane conditions for profit, with little regard for their welfare. Both situations cause significant suffering for the animals involved.

=== Hunting ===
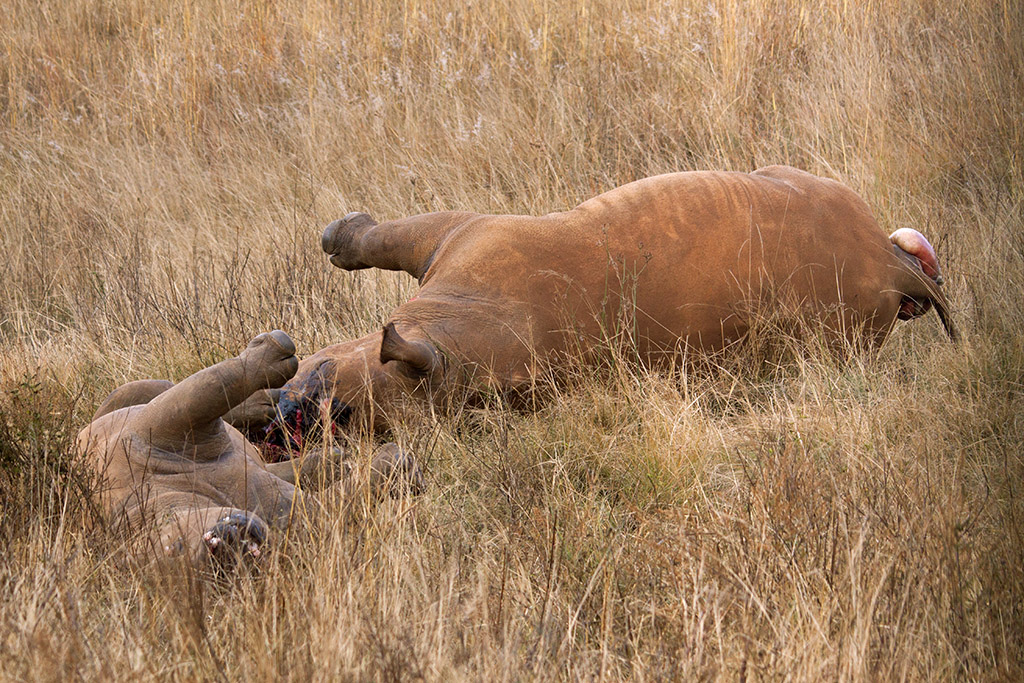
Rhinoceroses killed for their horns

Some animal rights and anti-hunting activists regard hunting as a cruel, perverse and unnecessary blood sport.

Trophy hunting is largely a recreational activity causing death and injury to a significant number of animals. In poaching the animal is killed and valuable parts such as tusks or bones are collected. Canned hunting refers to the practice of bringing exotic animals as trophies to private land for hunting. Despite being cruel to animals, hunting is practiced in thousands of private properties around the world and is considered a profitable business.

Internet hunting is the practice of hunting via remotely controlled firearms that can be aimed and shot using online webcams. Internet hunting may be considered cruel because it involves shooting confined animals remotely, which may give them no chance to escape and may cause unnecessary suffering due to poor aim or delayed death. This practice may be condemned for treating animals as mere targets rather than respecting their welfare.

=== Industrial animal farming ===
Footage of cruelty in a pig farm, that had been falsely described as 'Quality Assured', in England

Cruelty in a pig farm

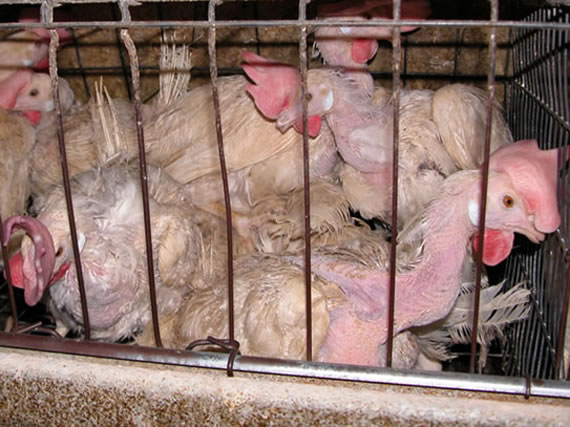
Egg-laying hens in a crowded cage

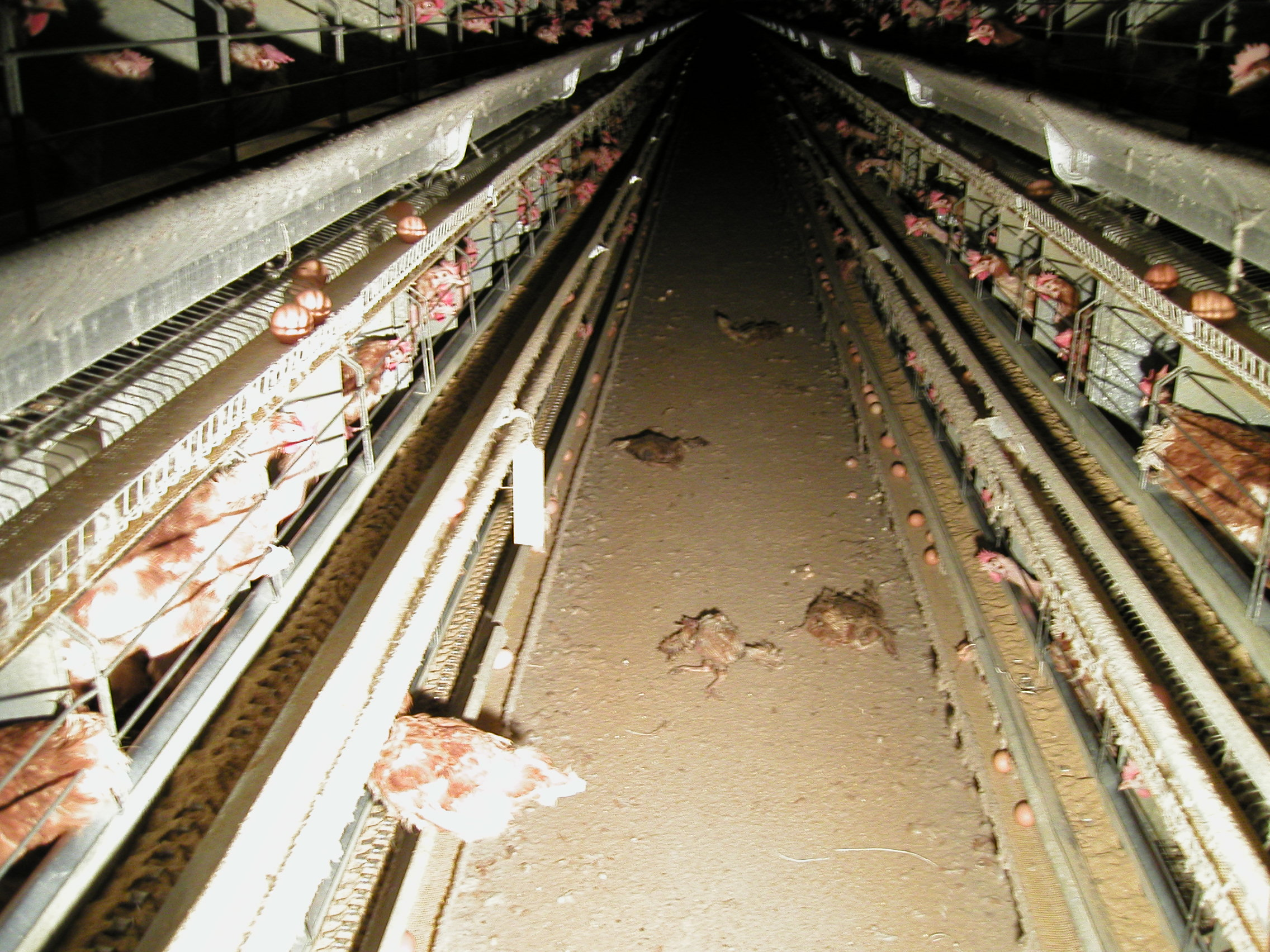
A chicken egg production facility

Farm animals are generally produced in large, industrial facilities that house thousands of animals at high densities; these are sometimes called factory farms. The industrial nature of these facilities means that many routine procedures or animal husbandry practices impinge on the welfare of the animals and could be considered cruelty, with Henry Stephen Salt claiming in 1899 that "it is impossible to transport and slaughter vast numbers of large and highly-sensitive animals humanely". It has been suggested the number of animals hunted, kept as companions, used in laboratories, reared for the fur industry, raced, and used in zoos and circuses, is insignificant compared to farm animals, and therefore the "animal welfare issue" is numerically reducible to the "farm animal welfare issue". Similarly, it has been suggested by campaign groups that chickens, cows, pigs, and other farm animals are among the most numerous animals subjected to cruelty. For example, because male chickens do not lay eggs, newly hatched males are culled using macerators or grinders. Worldwide meat overconsumption is another factor that contributes to the miserable situation of farm animals. Many undercover investigators have exposed the animal cruelty taking place inside the factory farming industry and there is evidence to show that consumers provided with accurate information about the process of meat production and the abuse that accompanies it has led to changes in their attitudes.

The American Veterinary Medical Association accepts maceration subject to certain conditions, but recommends alternative methods of culling as more humane. Egg-laying hens are then transferred to "battery cages" where they are kept in high densities. Matheny and Leahy attribute osteoporosis in hens to this caging method. Broiler chickens suffer similar situations, in which they are fed steroids to grow at a super-fast speed, so fast that their bones, heart, and lungs often cannot keep up. Broiler chickens under six weeks old suffer painful crippling due to fast growth rates, whilst one in a hundred of these very young birds dies of heart failure.

To reduce aggression in overcrowded conditions, shortly after birth piglets are castrated, their tails are amputated, and their teeth are clipped, and earmarked. Dairy cattle are repeatedly impregnated, which results in high rates of perinatal and neonatal loss, and even with the use of assisted reproductive technologies, which can also include Large offspring syndrome (LOS), as well as stress and other health problems, including significant calving difficulties to keep the milk flowing, with their calves being taken away from them after birth and are also dehorned, docked, branded, and castrated. Calves are sometimes raised in veal crates, which are small stalls that immobilize calves during their growth, reducing costs and preventing muscle development, making the resulting meat a pale color, preferred by consumers.

In the United States, animal cruelty such as soring, which is illegal, sometimes occurs on farms and ranches, as does lawful but cruel treatment such as livestock branding. Since ag-gag laws prohibit video or photographic documentation of farm activities, these practices have been documented by secret photography taken by whistleblowers or undercover operatives from such organizations as Mercy for Animals and the Humane Society of the United States posing as employees. Agricultural organizations such as the American Farm Bureau Federation have successfully advocated for laws that tightly restrict secret photography or concealing information from farm employers.

A downer is an animal, usually livestock, that cannot stand on its own and therefore is to be killed. A downed animal, one that is unable to stand, is not necessarily a downer. Neglect, abuse, or inhumane handling of downer animals is considered animal cruelty and is illegal in many jurisdictions.

=== Invasive cosmetic procedures ===
Tail docking in dogs is widely considered animal cruelty when performed for cosmetic or non-medical reasons.

Painting fish using artificial dyes, injections, or caustic dips is considered cruel and unnecessary by animal welfare organizations and experts.

=== Neglect ===
Animal neglect is a form of abuse that involves failing to provide adequate care, nutrition, shelter, or medical attention to animals.

A study in Pinhais, Brazil, examined the crime of companion animal neglect within households and found it was more common in homes with a larger number of animals, poor economic conditions, the presence of disabled individuals, and lower educational levels among owners. Identifying these factors is important for creating strategies to prevent this crime.

=== Pinioning ===
Pinioning is the act of surgically removing one pinion joint, the joint of a bird's wing furthest from the body, to prevent flight. Pinioning is often done to waterfowl and poultry. It is not typically done to companion bird species such as parrots. This practice is unnecessary and restricted in many countries.

Pinioning is legally restricted in many countries. In England, if the bird is more than 10 days old, its pinioning may only be performed using anaesthetic and, regardless of the bird's age, the procedure is illegal unless carried out by a veterinarian. It is also illegal to perform on farmed birds. In Austria, pinioning is prohibited based on §5 (Prohibition of cruelty to animals) and §7 (Prohibited interventions performed on animals) of the Animal Protection Act.

=== Sexual abuse ===
Animal sexual abuse, or bestiality, occurs when an individual exploits a non-human animal for their own sexual pleasure or for the pleasure of others. Bestiality is strongly associated by many with zoophilia, a paraphilia involving sexual attraction to non-human animals. One such individual is Douglas Spink, who was convicted of allegedly owning a bestiality farm in which several animals such as dogs, horses and mice were found.

Horse-ripping, or horse slashing, is an animal cruelty phenomenon involving serious injuries in horses, often involving mutilation of their genitalia and slashing of the flank or neck. It has not been established, however, how often these injuries are caused by human cruelty. "Horse-ripping" is not an entirely neutral term since it implies there is always a human act behind the mutilations.

=== Smuggling ===
==== Illegal drug trade ====
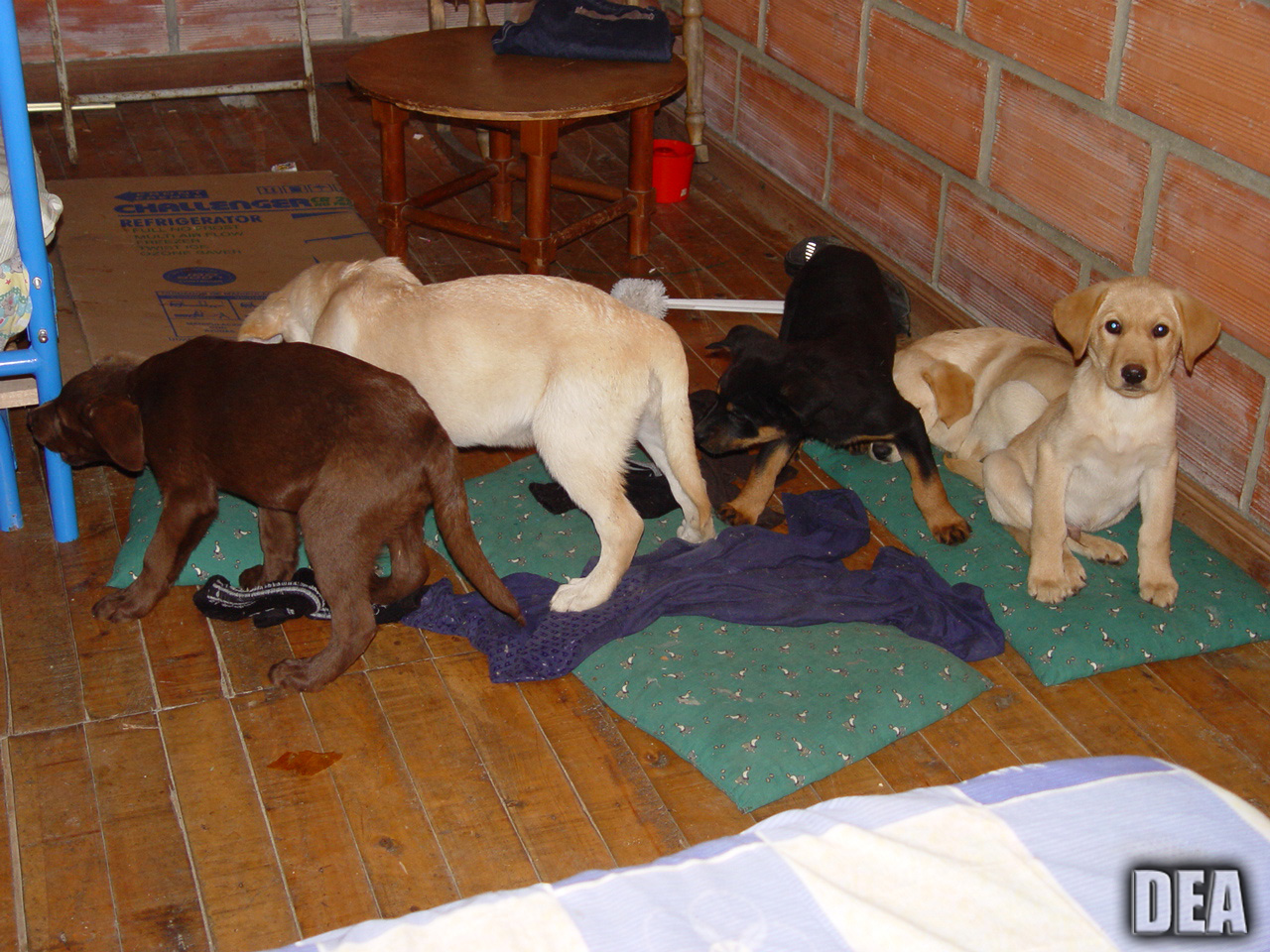
The puppies pictured had packets of liquid heroin surgically implanted in them by a veterinarian drug smuggler.

In some cases, traffickers have attached drug packages to animals in an attempt to smuggle contraband. This method is more common than surgical implantation, as it is simpler and less risky for traffickers.

In very rare cases, traffickers have surgically implanted drugs into animals.

At Miami International Airport in 1993, authorities discovered that some of the 312 boa constrictors in a shipment from Colombia had been surgically filled with condoms containing a total of 80 pounds (36 kg) of cocaine, resulting in the death of all the snakes.

==== Wildlife smuggling ====
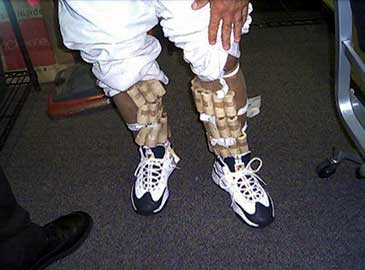
Smuggler of rare birds apprehended at the US border

Wildlife smuggling often involves transporting live animals in cruel conditions, causing them great suffering. Animals are frequently confined in cramped spaces without food or water, leading to injury, illness, or death. This inhumane treatment makes wildlife smuggling a serious form of animal cruelty.

=== Transport ===
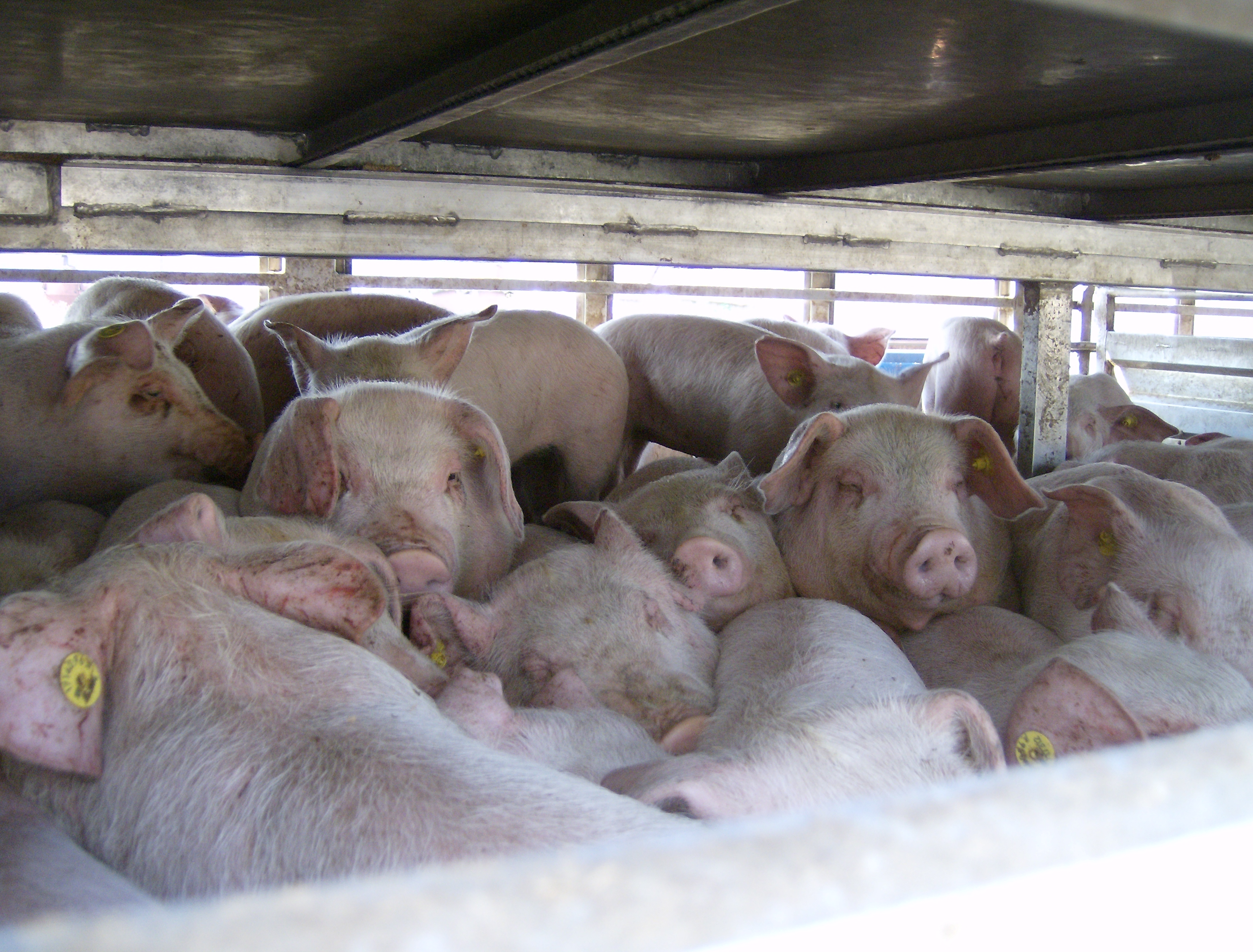
Inside a truck transporting farm animals to slaughter. Dehydration, injuries, stress, and disease are common during preslaughter transport, and cramped and unhygienic conditions are typical of the process.

Despite existing regulations in many countries, transport cruelty remains a widespread problem due to inadequate enforcement and economic pressures to minimize costs. Animals being moved for slaughter, sale, or display are frequently kept in cramped conditions for extended periods, with minimal attention to their physical and psychological needs. This issue is especially pronounced during long-distance transport, such as when animals are shipped from other countries or even across continents. During these journeys, animals may endure days or even weeks of travel, often facing extreme temperatures, lack of food and water, and insufficient rest. The stress and injuries sustained during transport can have lasting effects on animal welfare, and in some cases, animals may not survive the journey. Addressing transport cruelty—particularly in the context of international and intercontinental movement—requires stricter oversight, better training for handlers, and a commitment to prioritizing animal well-being throughout the entire transportation process.

One concern about the welfare of horses destined for slaughter is the long distances the horses are sometimes transported to a slaughterhouse. In 2013, 32,841 horses were slaughtered in Italy; of these, 32,316 were transported from other EU states.

=== Trapping ===
Snares are one of the simplest traps and are very effective. They are cheap to produce and easy to set in large numbers. A snare traps an animal around the neck or the body; a snare consists of a noose made usually by wire or a strong string. Snares are widely criticised by animal welfare groups for their cruelty.

Domestic animals accidentally captured in glue traps can be released by carefully applying cooking oil or baby oil to the contact areas and gently working until the animal is free. Many animal rights groups, such as the Humane Society of the United States and In Defense of Animals, oppose the use of glue traps for their cruelty to animals.

=== Warfare ===
Military animals are creatures that have been employed by humankind for use in warfare. They are a specific application of working animals; examples include dogs, dolphins, elephants, and horses. Only recently has the involvement of animals in war been questioned, and practices such as using animals for fighting, as living bombs, or for military testing purposes (such as during the Bikini Atoll atomic experiments) may now be criticized for being cruel.

Princess Anne, Princess Royal, the patron of the British Animals in War Memorial, stated that animals adapt to what humans want them to do, but that they will not do things that they do not want to, even with training. Animal participation in the human conflict was commemorated in the United Kingdom in 2004 with the erection of the Animals in War Memorial in Hyde Park, London.

In 2008 a video of a US Marine throwing a puppy over a cliff during the Iraq conflict was popularised as an internet phenomenon and attracted widespread criticism of the soldier's actions for being an act of cruelty.

=== Welfare concerns of farm animals ===
The following are lists of invasive procedures that cause pain, routinely performed on farm animals, and housing conditions that routinely cause animal welfare concerns. In one survey of United States homeowners, 68% of respondents said they consider the price of meat a more important issue.

Welfare concerns of farm animals
Species	Invasive procedures	Housing
Broiler chickens	Beak trimming	High stocking density; Restricted movement
Cattle	Branding; Castration; Dehorning; Ear tagging; Nose ringing; Restraint; Tail docking; Tongue resection (calves)	High stocking density (feedlots); Restricted movement (feedlots); Veal crates
Dairy cattle	Restraint; Artificial insemination; Dehorning; Ear tagging; Tail docking; Branding; Nose ringing	High stocking density; Restricted movement; Cow-calf separation, separation of mother and calf; Bounded by milk machines
Domestic turkeys	Debeaking; Desnooding (Note: 'Desnooding' is the removal of the snood, a fleshy appendage on the forehead of turkeys.); Detoeing; Devocalization; Spur removal; Toe clipping; Turkeybeating	High stocking density; Restricted movement
Dogs	Castration; Docking; Ear cropping; Ear notching; Slaughter by electrocution; Slaughter by beating	High stocking density; Restricted movement
Ducks and geese	Force-feeding; Live-plucking; Wing clipping	High stocking density; Restricted movement
Egg laying hens	Debeaking; Chick culling; Blinders (Note: 'Blinders' or 'spectacles' are included as some versions require a pin to pierce the nasal septum.); Dubbing (Note: 'Dubbing' is the procedure of removing the comb, wattles and sometimes earlobes of poultry. Removing the wattles is sometimes called "dewattling".)	Forced molting; High stocking density; Hock burns; Restricted movement
Goats and sheep	Ear tagging; Ear notching; Dehorning; Marking (Note: 'Marking' is the simultaneous mulesing, castration, and tail docking of lambs.); Mulesing (Note: 'Mulesing' is the removal of strips of wool-bearing skin from around the breech (buttocks) of a sheep to prevent flystrike (myiasis)); Tail docking; Teeth grinding	High stocking density (fine wool industry, live export); Restricted movement (fine wool industry, live export)
Horses	Branding; Castration; Chaining; Gingering	High stocking density; Restricted movement
Pigs	Castration; CO_{2} stunning; Ear cropping; Ear tagging; Earmarking; Nose ringing; Tail docking; Tattooing; Teeth clipping; Tusk trimming	Gestation crates; High stocking density; Restricted movement

=== Working animals ===
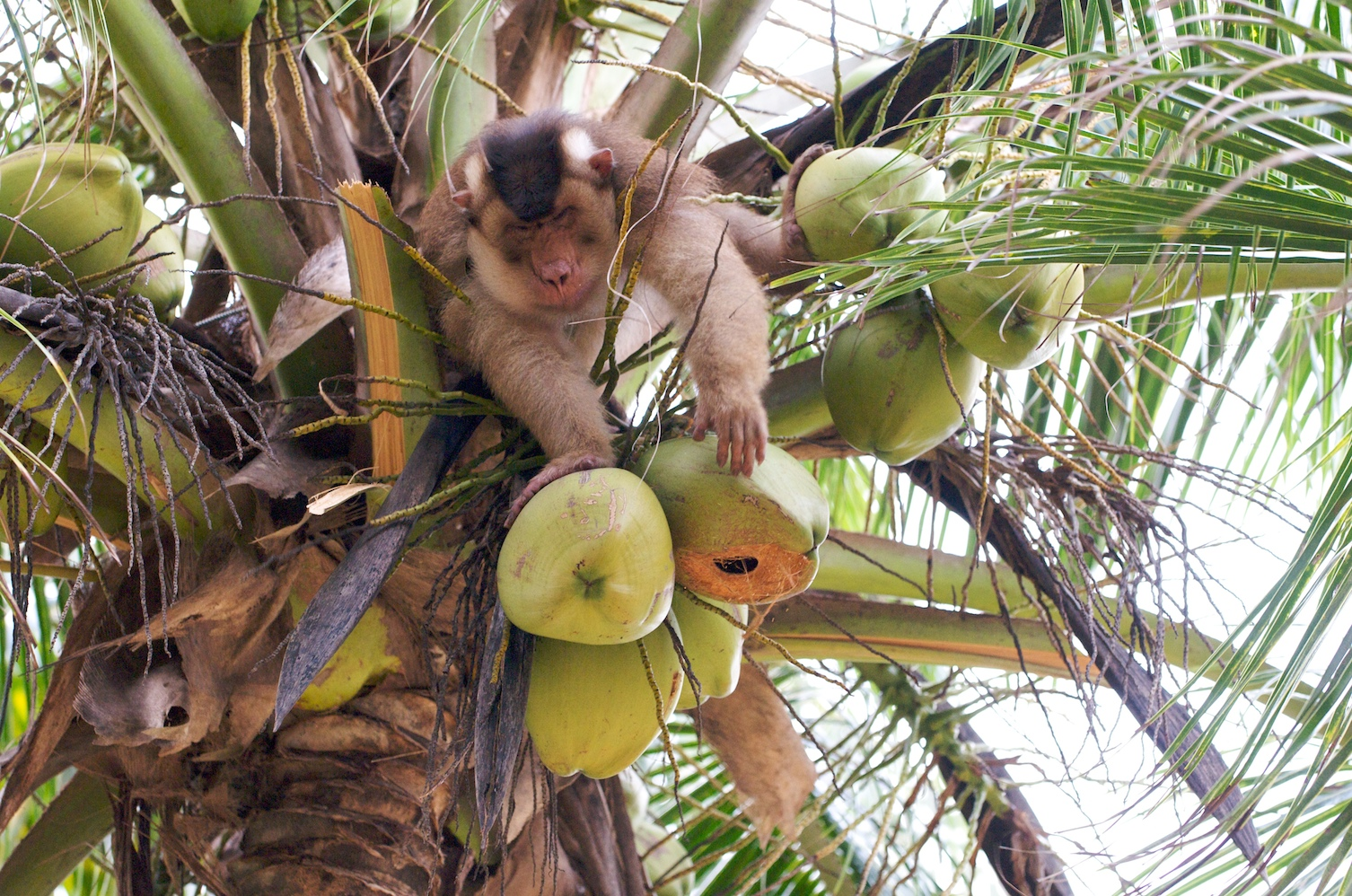
A Southern pig-tailed macaque sits in the crown of a coconut palm in Malaysia, grasping a coconut as it prepares to harvest it

The Southern pig-tailed macaque is the only monkey species widely used for labor, especially in Thailand and Malaysia, where they have been trained for centuries—mainly through punishment-based methods—to harvest coconuts and other fruits. Although now limited to a small number of farmers, the practice persists, with training schools still operating in southern Thailand and the Malaysian state of Kelantan. The practice drew international attention in 2019 when PETA exposed the use of macaques for coconut harvesting in Thailand, leading to calls for boycotts of coconut products. PETA later clarified that this practice does not occur in other major coconut-producing regions such as the Philippines, India, Brazil, Colombia, or Hawaii.

=== Historical ===
Bear pits have largely fallen out of favor, as many zoos now try to make their animals' accommodations more natural. Zoo visitors tend to view animals in natural settings as "active", and those in more artificial settings as "passive".

Bull running was a custom practised in England until the 19th century. (Note: Griffin-Kremer has suggested that bull running, as distinct from bull baiting, may also have occasionally occurred in Waterford, Ireland; however, the release of the bull through the town seems to have been a protest at the failure of newly-elected mayors to provide the traditional rope, collar and buckle "at the charge of the city revenue" for the annual bull baiting.) It involved chasing a bull through the streets of a town until it was weakened, then slaughtering the animal and butchering it for its meat. Bull running became illegal in 1835, and the last bull run took place in Stamford, Lincolnshire, in 1839. The practice was not confined to any particular region, with bull runs also documented at Axbridge in the south west, Canterbury and Wokingham in the south east, Tutbury in the midlands, and Wisbech in the east.

Cat burning was a form of cruelty to animals as an entertainment or festivity in Western and Central Europe prior to the 1800s. People would gather cats and hoist them onto a bonfire causing death by burning or otherwise through the effects of exposure to extreme heat. In the medieval to early modern periods, cats, which were associated with vanity and witchcraft, were sometimes burned as symbols of the devil.

The Cave of Dogs (Italian: Grotta del Cane) is a cave near Naples, Italy. Volcanic gases seeping into the cave give the air inside a high concentration of carbon dioxide. Dogs held inside would faint; at one time this was a tourist attraction.

A diving horse is an attraction that was popular in North America in the mid-1880s, in which a horse would dive into a pool of water, sometimes from as high as 60 feet.

Dog spinning (Bulgarian: тричане на куче(та), trichane na kuche(ta)) is a ritual that was traditionally practiced on the first day of Lent in the village of Brodilovo in southeastern Bulgaria. The ritual is thought to have pagan origins

The Foreign Cattle Market is a significant historical example of industrial animal handling and slaughter. While not intended as animal cruelty, many of its practices would be considered problematic today.

Geek shows were an act in traveling carnivals and circuses of early America and were often part of a larger sideshow. The billed performer's act consisted of a single geek, who stood in the center ring to chase live chickens. It ended with the performer biting the chickens' heads off and swallowing them.

Goat throwing (in Spanish: Lanzamiento de cabra desde campanario or Salto de la cabra) was a festival celebrated in the town of Manganeses de la Polvorosa, province of Zamora, Spain, on the fourth Sunday of January. The festival coincided with the commemoration of Saint Vincent the Martyr.

The act of goldfish swallowing was a fad first popularized by students at American colleges in the late 1930s.

Kots Kaal Pato was an event held annually in the town of Citilcum, located in the municipality of Izamal, within the state of Yucatán, Mexico. In it, piñatas stuffed with live animals were broken and ducks were hung from a wooden structure to later behead them. Since 2016, as a result of the efforts of Humane Society International Mexico and local organizations, the event no longer has this type of practices, instead featuring various sports and cultural activities.

== Alleged link to human violence and psychological disorders ==
There are studies providing evidence of a link between animal cruelty and violence towards humans. A 2009 study found that slaughterhouse employment increases total arrest rates, arrests for violent crimes, arrests for rape, and arrests for other sex offenses in comparison with other industries. A large national survey by the Norwegian Centre for Violence and Traumatic Stress Studies found a "substantial overlap between companion animal abuse and child abuse" and that cruelty to animals "most frequently co-occurred with psychological abuse and less severe forms of physical child abuse."

A history of torturing pets and small animals, a behavior known as zoosadism, is considered one of the signs of certain psychopathologies, including antisocial personality disorder, also known as a psychopathic personality disorder. According to The New York Times, "[the FBI has found that a history of cruelty to animals is one of the traits that regularly appears in its computer records of serial rapists and murderers, and the standard diagnostic and treatment manual for psychiatric and emotional disorders lists cruelty to animals a diagnostic criterion for conduct disorders." "A survey of psychiatric patients who had repeatedly tortured dogs and cats found all of them had high levels of aggression toward people as well, including one patient who had murdered a young boy." Robert K. Ressler, an agent with the Federal Bureau of Investigation's behavioral sciences unit, studied serial killers and noted, "Murderers like this (Jeffrey Dahmer) very often start by killing and torturing animals as kids."

Acts of intentional animal cruelty or non-accidental injury may be indicators of serious psychological problems. According to the American Humane Association, 13% of intentional animal abuse cases involve domestic violence. As many as 71% of pet-owning women seeking shelter at safe houses have reported that their partner had threatened and/or hurt or killed one or more of their pets; 32% of these women reported that one or more of their children had also hurt or killed pets. Battered women report that they are hesitant about leaving their abusers because they fear what will happen to the animals in their absence. Animal abuse is sometimes used as a form of intimidation in domestic disputes.

Cruelty to animals is one of the three components of the Macdonald triad. This behavior is considered to be one of the signs of violent antisocial behavior in children and adolescents. According to the studies used to form this model, cruelty to animals is a common (but not universal) behavior in children and adolescents who grow up to become serial killers and other violent criminals. It has also been found that children who are cruel to animals have often witnessed or been victims of abuse themselves. In two separate studies cited by the Humane Society of the United States, roughly one-third of families suffering from domestic abuse indicated that at least one child had hurt or killed a pet.

Monkey hate is a form of sadism where humans have a hatred for monkeys and take pleasure in their suffering. The phenomenon drew public attention after a global monkey torture ring was uncovered by the BBC in 2023.

== Laws by country ==
Legal requirements for ritual slaughter around the world: Stunning not required Post-cut stunning required Simultaneous stunning required Pre-cut stunning required Ritual slaughter banned No data

Many jurisdictions around the world have enacted statutes that forbid cruelty to some animals but these vary by country and in some cases by the use or practice.

=== Africa ===
==== Egypt ====
Egyptian law states that anyone who inhumanely beats or intentionally kills any domesticated animal may be jailed or fined. The Egyptian Society for the Prevention of Cruelty to Animals was established over a hundred years ago and was instrumental in promoting a 1997 ban on bullfighting in Egypt.

In ancient Egyptian law, the killers of cats or dogs were executed.

==== Nigeria ====
Animal cruelty in Nigeria is prohibited under Section 495 of the Criminal Code (1990). These include, according to 495(1)(a), cruelly beating, kicking, over-loading, infuriating, or terrifying an animal, or allowing this to happen as the owner. Section 495(1)(b) defines failure to act as the willful or unreasonable doing or omission of any act that causes unnecessary suffering (or as the owner, permitting an act that causes unnecessary suffering). This section also prohibits transporting animals in a way that causes unnecessary suffering (c), administering poison (d), performing operations without due care (e), and actions related to animal fighting (f).

==== South Africa ====
The Animal Protection Act No 71 of 1962 in South Africa covers "farm animals, domestic animals and birds, and wild animals, birds, and reptiles that are in captivity or under the control of humans."

The Act contains a detailed list of prohibited acts of cruelty including overloading, causing unnecessary suffering due to confinement, chaining or tethering, abandonment, unnecessarily denying food or water, keeping in a dirty or parasitic condition, or failing to provide veterinary assistance. There is also a general provision prohibiting wanton, unreasonable, or negligible commission or omission of acts resulting in unnecessary suffering. The Department of Agriculture, Forestry and Fisheries for 2013/14 to 2016/17 mentions updating animal protection legislation.

The NSPCA is the largest and oldest animal welfare organization in South Africa that enforces 90% of all animal cruelty cases in the country by means of enforcing the Animals Protection Act.

==== South Sudan ====
The Criminal Code of South Sudan has laws against the maltreatment of animals. The laws read:

196. Ill-treatment of Domestic Animal.

Whoever cruelly beats, tortures, or otherwise willfully ill-treats any tame, domestic, or wild animal, which has previously been deprived of its liberty, or arranges, promotes, or organizes fights between cocks, rams, bulls, or other domestic animals or encourages such acts, commits an offense, and upon conviction, shall be sentenced to imprisonment for a term not exceeding two months or with a fine.

197. Riding and Neglect of Animal.

Whoever wantonly rides, overdrives, or overloads any animal or intentionally drugs or employs any animal, which by reason of age, sickness, wounds or infirmity is not in a condition to work, or neglects any animal in such a manner as to cause it unnecessary suffering, commits an offense, and upon conviction, shall be sentenced to imprisonment for a term not exceeding one month or with a fine or with both.

=== Americas ===
==== Argentina ====
In Argentina, National Law 14346 sanctions from 15 days to one year in prison for those who mistreat or inflict acts of cruelty on animals. Tourism is one of the main economic activities in Argentina, and animals are often used as part of the attractions offered to visitors. Several of these practices have raised concerns regarding animal welfare.

Horses have historically been part of Argentine culture and identity. In some tourist cities, horse-drawn carriages (carruajes) are still used as attractions. NGOs such as Caballos en Libertad in Buenos Aires and Fundación Sin Estribos in Córdoba rescue mistreated horses. Reports of overwork, inadequate care, and abuse have prompted municipal authorities to propose restrictions and reforms.

At Iguazú National Park, the interaction between tourists and coatis has been described as problematic. Visitors often feed coatis with human food, which alters their diet, generates dependency, and exposes them to health issues. Close interactions, such as touching or taking photographs at very short distance, have also been reported to cause aggressive behavior and accidents. Park authorities and researchers warn that such practices disrupt the animals' natural behavior and may increase human-wildlife conflicts.

=== Brazil ===
Brazil is a high-volume animal producer, slaughtering around 30.8 land-based animals per person per year, compared to a global average of 10.1. The country's dependency on farmed animals is relatively high, with around 8 farmed animals per person, double the global average of 4.1. A 1998 law prohibits the abuse of domestic and wild animals. It imposes more serious penalties for cruelty than the 1934 decree, with a sentence of 3 months to a year plus a fine, with the penalty increased by one-sixth to one-third of the animal is killed.

=== Canada ===
In Canada, it is an offense under the Criminal Code to intentionally cause unnecessary pain, suffering, or injury to an animal. Poisoning animals is specifically prohibited. It is also an offense to threaten to harm an animal belonging to someone else. Most provinces and territories also have animal protection legislation. However, it is not explicitly illegal in Canadian law to kill a dog or cat for consumption.

The Animal Legal Defense Fund releases an annual report ranking the animal protection laws of every province and territory based on their relative strength and general comprehensiveness. In 2014, the strongest four jurisdictions were Manitoba, British Columbia, Ontario, and Nova Scotia. The weakest four were Saskatchewan, Northwest Territories, Quebec, and Nunavut.

=== Chile ===
Law 20380 established sanctions including fines, from 2 to 30 Mensual Tributary Units, and prison, from 541 days to 3 years, for those involved in acts of animal cruelty. Also, it facilitates animal care through school education and establishes a Bioethics Committee to define policies related to experiments with animals.

=== Colombia ===
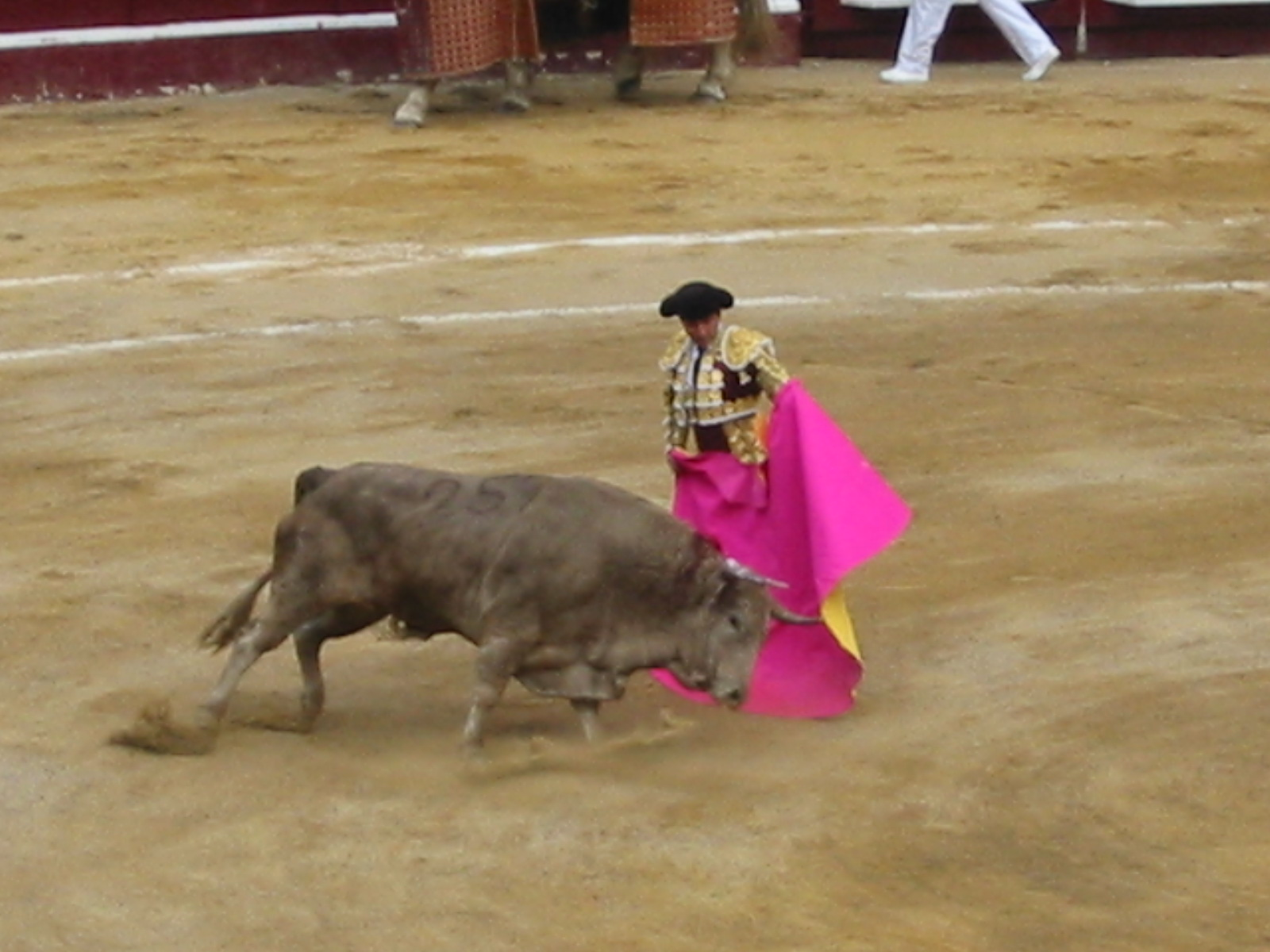
A bullfight in Bogotá, a legacy of Spanish culture. The practice of bullfighting is criticized by numerous organizations in Colombia. It remains legal in the country.

In Colombia, there is little control over cruel behaviors against animals, and the government has proposed that bullfighting be declared a "Cultural Heritage". Other activities like cockfighting are given the same legal treatment.

=== Costa Rica ===
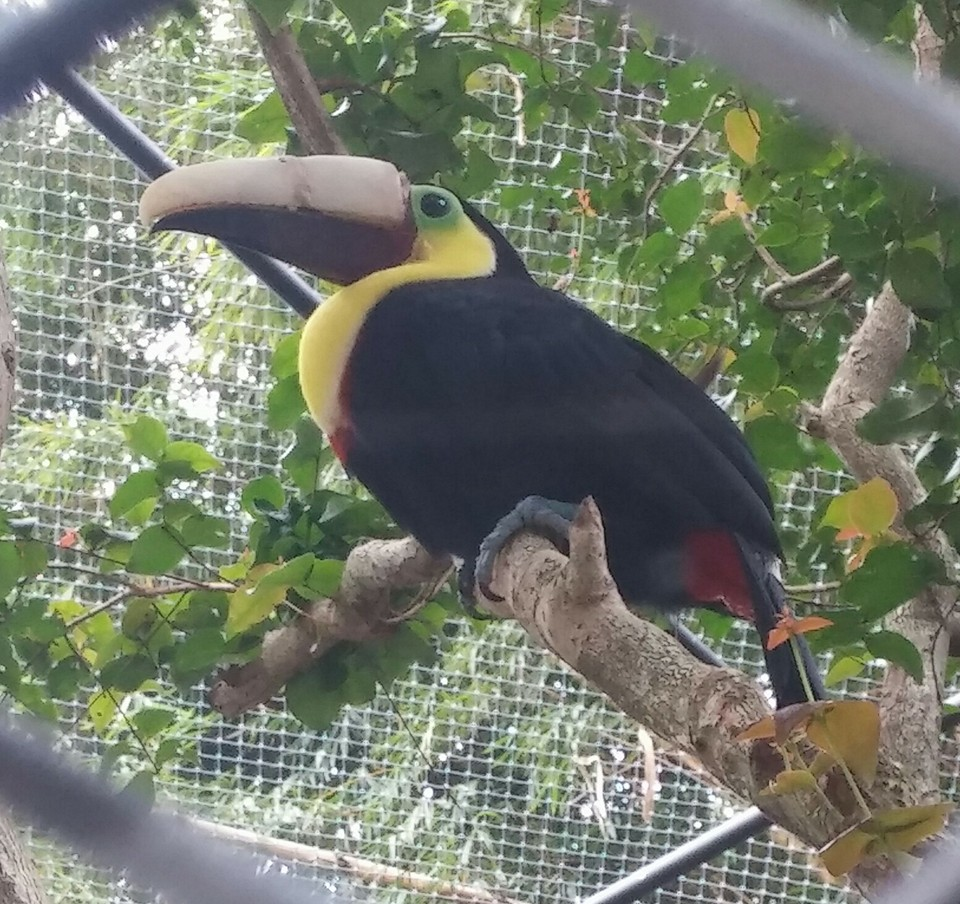
Toucan Grecia with 3D printed prosthetic beak after losing half its beak

In 2017, after many years of legal wrangling, Costa Rica passed their Animal Welfare Law. It includes prison sentences of three months to one year for harming or killing a domesticated animal or for conducting animal fights. There are monetary fines for those who mistreat, neglect or abandon animals, for breeding or training animals for fighting, or for violating regulations on animal experimentation. The law does not cover agricultural practices, aquaculture, zootechnical or veterinary activities, killing of animals for consumption, for sanitary or scientific reasons, or reproductive control. Wild animals are covered under the Wild Life Act.

The bill had stalled its motion through the legislature until an injured toucan was found which had lost the top half of its beak. News and images of the injured bird, now named Grecia, raised enough contributions to create a 3D printed prosthesis for her, and helped spur the bill's progress.

=== Mexico ===
The current policy of Mexico, in civil law, condemns physical harm to animals as property damage to the owners of the abused animal, considering the animals as owned property.

In criminal law, the situation is different. In December 2012, the Legislative Assembly of the Federal District reformed the existing Penal Code of Mexico City, establishing abuse and cruelty to animals as criminal offenses, provided the animals are not deemed to be plagues or pests. Abandoned animals are not considered to be plagues. A subsequent reform was entered into force on 31 January 2013, by a decree published in the Official Gazette of the Federal District. The law provides penalties of six months to two years imprisonment, and a fine of 50 to 100 days at minimum wage, to persons who cause obvious injury to an animal, and the penalty is increased by one-half of those injuries endanger its life. The penalty rises to two to four years of prison, and a fine of 200 to 400 days at minimum wage, if the person intentionally causes the death of an animal.

This law is considered to extend throughout the rest of the 31 constituent states of the country. In addition, The Law of Animal Protection of the Federal District is wide-ranging, based on banning "unnecessary suffering". Similar laws now exist in most states.

=== United States ===
The primary federal law relating to animal care and conditions in the US is the Animal Welfare Act of 1966, amended in 1970, 1976, 1985, 1990, 2002, and 2007. It is the only Federal law in the United States that regulates the treatment of animals in research, exhibition, transport, and by dealers. Other laws, policies, and guidelines may include additional species coverage or specifications for animal care and use, but all refer to the Animal Welfare Act as the minimum acceptable standard.

The Animal Legal Defense Fund releases an annual report ranking the animal protection laws of every state based on their relative strength and general comprehensiveness. In a 2013's report, the top five states for their strong anti-cruelty laws were Illinois, Maine, Michigan, Oregon, and California. The five states with the weakest animal cruelty laws in 2013 were Kentucky, Iowa, South Dakota, New Mexico, and Wyoming.

In Massachusetts and New York, agents of humane societies and associations may be appointed as special officers to enforce statutes outlawing animal cruelty.

In 2004, a Florida legislator proposed a ban on "cruelty to bovines", stating: "A person who, for practice, entertainment, or sport, intentionally fells, trips, or otherwise causes a cow to fall or lose its balance using roping, lassoing, dragging, or otherwise touching the tail of the cow commits a misdemeanor of the first degree." The proposal did not become law.

In the United States, ear cropping, tail docking, rodeo sports, and other acts are legal and sometimes condoned. Penalties for cruelty can be minimal if pursued. Currently, 46 of the 50 states have enacted felony penalties for certain forms of animal abuse. However, in most jurisdictions, animal cruelty is most commonly charged as a misdemeanor offense. In one recent California case, a felony conviction for animal cruelty could theoretically net a 25-year to a life sentence due to their three-strikes law, which increases sentences based on prior felony convictions.

In 2003, West Hollywood, California, passed an ordinance banning declawing of house cats. In 2007, Norfolk, Virginia passed legislation only allowing the procedure for medical reasons. However, most jurisdictions allow the procedure.

In April 2013, Texas Federal Court Judge Sim Lake ruled that the Animal Crush Video Prohibition Act of 2010, which criminalized the recording, sale, and transport of videos depicting animal cruelty as obscenity, violates the First Amendment. Judge Lake noted that obscenity tests require an explicitly sexual depiction, which the criminalized videos lack. This follows the precedent set by United States v. Stevens, which additionally held that restrictions on the possession of animal cruelty videos were unconstitutional.

In November 2019, U.S. President Donald Trump signed the Preventing Animal Cruelty and Torture Act, making certain intentional acts of cruelty to animals federal crimes carrying penalties of up to seven years in prison. The Act expanded upon the 2010 Animal Crush Video Prohibition Act signed by President Barack Obama that banned the creation and distribution of videos that showed animals being crushed, burned, drowned, suffocated, impaled, or subjected to other forms of torture. The underlying acts, which were not included in the 2010 bill, are part of the PACT Act and are now federal offenses. The bill was unanimously passed in both the House and Senate.

==== State welfare laws ====
Several states have enacted or considered laws in support of humane farming.

- On 5 November 2002, Florida voters passed Amendment 10 by a margin of 55%, amending the Florida Constitution to ban the confinement of pregnant pigs in gestation crates.
- On 14 January 2004, the bill AB-732 died in the California Assembly's Agriculture Committee. The bill would have banned gestation and veal crates, eventually being amended to include only veal crates. On 9 May 2007, the bill AB-594 was withdrawn from the California State Assembly. The bill had been effectively killed in the Assembly Agriculture Committee, by replacing the contents of the bill with language concerning tobacco cessation coverage under Medi-Cal. AB-594 was very similar to the current language of Proposition 2.
- On 7 November 2006, Arizona voters passed Proposition 204 with 62% support. The measure prohibits the confinement of calves in veal crates and breeding sows in gestation crates.
- On 28 June 2007, Oregon Governor Ted Kulongoski signed a measure into law prohibiting the confinement of pigs in gestation crates (SB 694, 74th Leg. Assembly, Regular Session).
- In January 2008, Nebraska State Senate bill LB 1148, to ban the use of gestation crates for pig farmers, was withdrawn within five days amidst controversy.
- On 14 May 2008, Colorado Governor Bill Ritter signed into law a bill, SB 201, that phases out gestation crates and veal crates.

=== Venezuela ===
Venezuela published a "Law for Protection of Domestic Fauna free and in captivity" in 2010, defining responsibilities and sanctions regarding animal care and ownership. Animal cruelty acts are fined, but are not a cause for imprisonment. The law also forbids the possession, breeding, and reproduction of pit bull dogs, among similar breeds that are alleged to be aggressive and dangerous. It elicited reactions from dog owners, who said that aggressiveness in dogs is determined more by treatment by the owner than by the breed itself.

=== Asia ===
==== Israel ====
Israel banned the sale of fur to the fashion industry in June 2021.

==== China ====
As of the year 2006, there were no laws in China governing acts of cruelty to animals. There are no government-supported charitable organizations like the RSPCA, which monitors the cases of animal cruelty. All kinds of animal abuses, such as to fish, tigers, and bears, are to be reported to law enforcement and animal welfare.

In the absence of a unified law against animal mistreatment, the World Animal Protection notes that some legislation protecting the welfare of animals exists in certain contexts, especially ones used in research and zoos.

In September 2009, legislation was drafted to address deliberate cruelty to animals in China. If passed, the legislation would offer some protection to pets, captive wildlife, and animals used in laboratories, as well as regulate how farm animals are raised, transported, and slaughtered.

In 2008, the People's Republic of China was in the process of making changes to its stray-dog population laws in the capital city, Beijing. Mr. Zheng Gang who is the director of the Internal and Judicial Committee which comes under the Beijing Municipal People's Congress (BMPC), supported the draft of the Beijing Municipal Regulation on Dogs from the local government. The law would replace the Beijing Municipal Regulation on Dog Ownership, introduced in 1989. The extant regulation talked of "strictly" limiting dog ownership and controlling the number of dogs in the city. The proposed draft focused instead on "strict management and combining restrictions with management."

==== Hong Kong ====
As of 2010, Hong Kong has supplemented or replaced the laws against cruelty with a positive approach using laws that specify how animals should be treated. The government department primarily responsible for animal welfare in Hong Kong is the Agriculture, Fisheries, and Conservation Department (AFCD).

Laws enforced by the AFCD include these:

- the Prevention of Cruelty to Animals Ordinance (also enforced by the police)
- the Public Health (Animals and Birds) Ordinance (including regulations for licenses imposed on livestock keepers and animal traders and a Code of Standards for Licensed Animal Traders)
- the Dogs and Cats Ordinance
- the Pounds Ordinance
- the Rabies Ordinance
- the Wild Animals Protection Ordinance

In addition, the Food and Environmental Hygiene Department (FEHD) does the following:

- enforces the Public Health and Municipal Services Ordinance, which includes regulations for slaughterhouses and wet markets
- publishes a Code of Practice for the Welfare of Food Animals (which describes their transport)
- publishes Operational Guidelines for the Welfare of Food Animals at Slaughterhouses

The Department of Health does the following:

- enforces the Animals (Control of Experiments) Ordinance.
- publishes a Code of Practice for the Care and Use of Animals for Experimental Purposes

As of 2006, Hong Kong has a law titled "Prevention of Cruelty to Animals Ordinance", with maximum of 3-year imprisonment and fines of HKD$200,000.

==== India ====
The Prevention of Cruelty to Animals Act (PCA), 1960 was amended in the year 1982, criminalizes cruelty to animals, though exceptions are made for the treatment of animals used for food and scientific experiments. The maximum penalty under the Act is Rs. 50 (under $1) for first offense and Rs. 500 (under $10) and upto three months imprisonment for repeat offense, which is continued to be used despite being criticized for low penalty amount that has not been revised for over two decades. Since the adoption of Bharatiya Nyaya Sanhita (BNS), 2023, section 428 and 429 of IPC are replaced by section 325 of BNS that makes animal cruelty relating to killing, poisoning, maiming or 'rendering useless' a cognizable and bailable offense, with imposition of a maximum of 5 years sentence, fine or both. Animal cruelty that do not fall under this are litigated under other parts of legislation, that either generalize to animals or are restrictions on the use of draught animals or performing animals, animal transport, breeding, slaughter, or experimentation. Many organizations, including ones such as the local SPCA, PF, A, and Fosterdopt are actively involved in assisting the general population in reporting cruelty cases to the police and helping bring the perpetrator to justice. A series of amendments of the PCA, proposed in 2011-2022, to increase penalty of offense and impose stricter legislature have not passed through the parliament as of February 2026.

==== Iran ====
Iranian government sponsored a law banning pets, breeding, selling, walking and keeping in the cities also including Najis animals/birds. Animals lives and wellbeing are to some limited extent protected under Islamic criminal code and feqh. Filming animal abuse is illegal. Euthanasia is haram.

==== Japan ====
In Japan, the 1973 Welfare and Management of Animals Act (amended in 1999 and 2005) stipulates that "no person shall kill, injure, or inflict cruelty to animals without a due course", and in particular, criminalizes cruelty to all mammals, birds, and reptiles possessed by persons; as well as cattle, horses, goats, sheep, pigs, dogs, cats, pigeons, domestic rabbits, chickens, and domestic ducks regardless of whether they are in captivity.

- Killing or injuring without due reason: up to one year's imprisonment with labor or a fine of up to one million yen
- Cruelty such as causing debilitation by discontinuing feeding or watering without due reason: a fine of up to five hundred thousand yen
- Abandonment: a fine of up to five hundred thousand yen

Separate national and local ordinances exist about ensuring the health and safety of animals handled by pet shops and other businesses.

Animal experiments are regulated by the 2000 Law for the Humane Treatment and Management of Animals, which was amended in 2006. This law requires those using animals to follow the principles outlined in the 3Rs, which are listed as replacement, reduction, and refinement, to use as few animals as possible, and cause minimal distress and suffering. Regulation is at a local level based on national guidelines, but there are no governmental inspections of institutions and no reporting requirement for the numbers of animals used.

==== Malaysia ====
Cruelty towards animals protected under the Animal Welfare Act (2015) is punishable by a fine of 20–100,000 ringgit and/or imprisonment of up to three years. Cruelty towards animals protected under the Wildlife Conservation Act (2010) is punishable by a fine of 5–50,000 ringgit and/or up to one-year imprisonment. Under the AA, a person commits an offense of animal cruelty if they "cruelly beats, kicks, ill-treats, overrides, overdrives, overloads, tortures, infuriates or terrifies any animal.

==== Saudi Arabia ====
Veterinarian Lana Dunn and several Saudi nationals report that there are no laws to protect animals from cruelty since the term is not well-defined within the Saudi legal system. They point to a lack of a governing body to supervise conditions for animals, particularly in pet stores and in the exotic animal trade with East Africa.

==== South Korea ====
South Korea's animal welfare laws are weak by international standards. South Korea's animal protection law states that anyone who abuses or is cruel to animals may be sentenced to a maximum of three years in prison or fined 30 million won ($25,494), but the standards to decide penalties have been low as the animals are treated as objects under the current legal system, Choung said.

==== Taiwan ====
The Taiwanese Animal Protection Act was passed in 1998, imposing fines of up to NT$250,000 for cruelty. Criminal penalties for animal cruelty were enacted in 2009, including a maximum of one-year imprisonment.

==== Thailand ====
Thailand introduced its first animal welfare law in 2014. The Cruelty Prevention and Welfare of Animal Act, B.E. 2557 (2014) came into being on 27 December 2014.

=== Europe ===
==== European Union ====
The European Union Council Directive 1999/74/EC is a directive passed by the European Union on the minimum standards for keeping egg laying hens which effectively bans conventional battery cages. The directive passed in 1999, banned conventional battery cages in the EU from 1 January 2012 after a 13-year phase-out.

It is also illegal in many parts of Europe to declaw a cat.

==== France ====
In France, cruelty to animals is punishable by imprisonment of two years and a financial penalty (€30,000).

==== Germany ====
In Germany, killing animals or causing significant pain (or prolonged or repeated pain) to them is punishable by imprisonment of up to three years or a financial penalty. If the animal is of foreign origin, the act may also be punishable as criminal damage.

==== Italy ====
Acts of cruelty against animals can be punished with imprisonment, for a minimum of three months up to a maximum of three years, and with a fine ranging from a minimum of 3,000 euros to a maximum of 160,000 Euros, as for the law n°189/2004.

==== Ireland ====
The Animal Health and Welfare Act 2013 came into force in 2014, improving animal protection. The maximum penalty is up to €250,000 and up to five years in prison. Sentences of up to three years have been imposed in several cases.

==== Portugal ====
Since 1 October 2014, violence against animals has been a crime in Portugal. Legislation published in the Diário da República on 29 August criminalizes the mistreatment of animals and indicates that "those who, without reasonable cause, inflict pain, suffering, or any other hardship to a companion animal abuse" are to be subject to imprisonment of up to one year. If such acts result in the "death of the animal", the "deprivation of an important organ or member", or "serious and permanent impairment of its capacity of locomotion", those responsible will be punished by imprisonment up to two years.

As for pets, the new law provides that "whoever, having the duty to store, monitor or pet watch, abandons them, thereby putting in danger their food and the provision of care owed" faces up to six months imprisonment.

==== Sweden ====
In Sweden some forms of cruelty to animals is punishable by a financial penalty and prison for up to two years. The owner will lose the right to own animals and the animals will be removed from the owner.

==== Switzerland ====
The Swiss animal protection laws are among the strictest in the world, comprehensively regulating the treatment of animals including the size of rabbit cages, and the amount of exercise that must be provided to dogs.

In the canton of Zurich an animal lawyer, Antoine Goetschel, is employed by the canton government to represent the interests of animals in animal cruelty cases.

==== Turkey ====
Under Turkey's Animal Protection Law No. 5199, cruelty to animals is considered a criminal offense, punishable by up to four years in prison. In July 2021, Turkey banned the opening of circuses which use animals, and dolphinariums. Existing facilities will cease operations in ten years. HAYTAP, the Animal Rights Federation in Turkey, used to believe that the previous law did not contain a strong enough punishment for animal abusers. In 2024, a cruelty to animals case caused widespread outrage in social media in Turkey. Eros, a cat kept in a housing complex in Küçükçekmece, Istanbul, was tortured to death by İbrahim Keloğlan on 1 January in the early morning. The moments when Keloğlan tortured Eros to death were recorded by the security cameras of the site. Keloğlan was released with a good behavior discount at the first hearing of the case held on 8 February at the Küçükçekmece 16th Criminal Court of First Instance. A campaign was launched on social media against Keloğlan, who was given a good behavior discount, saying "Let İbrahim Keloğlan be arrested". A similar incident also occurred in 2025. Burak Alan, who came to a Başakşehir housing complex for renovations, tortured and killed a 6-year-old cat whose name was Cezve that approached him inside the building. The moment Alan tortured the cat was recorded second by second by the building's security camera. Justice Minister Yılmaz Tunç stated, "Following images circulating on social media of a cat being brutally kicked to death in Başakşehir, Istanbul, the Küçükçekmece Chief Public Prosecutor's Office immediately launched a judicial investigation under Law No. 5199 on the Protection of Animals. The suspect has been apprehended and detained, and legal proceedings regarding the incident are being meticulously pursued. These images of violence are unacceptable, neither in good conscience nor legally. Violence against animals will never go unpunished." Burak Alan, who was referred to Küçükçekmece Courthouse, was arrested under the "Animal Protection Law" and sent to prison. Burak Alan was sentenced to 3 years and 8 months in prison for "deliberately killing a pet.

==== United Kingdom ====
In the United Kingdom, cruelty to animals is a criminal offense for which one may be jailed for up to 6 months.

On 18 August 1911, the House of Commons introduced the Protection of Animals Act 1911 (c.27) following lobbying by the Royal Society for the Prevention of Cruelty to Animals (RSPCA). The maximum punishment was six months of hard labour with a fine of 25 pounds.

In the Metropolitan Police Act 1839 "fighting or baiting Lions, Bears, Badgers, Cocks, Dogs, or other Animals" was prohibited in London, with a penalty of up to one-month imprisonment, with possible hard labor, or up to five pounds. The law laid numerous restrictions on how, when, and where animals could be driven, wagons unloaded, etc. It also prohibited owners from letting mad dogs run loose and gave police the right to destroy any dog suspected of being rabid or any dog bitten by a suspected rabid dog. The same law prohibited the use of dogs for drawing carts.

Up until then, dogs were used for delivering milk, bread, fish, meat, fruit, vegetables, animal food (the cat's-meat man), and other items for sale and for collecting refuse (the rag-and-bone man). As Nigel Rothfels notes the prohibition against dogs pulling carts in or near London caused most of the dogs to be killed by their owners as they went from being contributors to the family income to unaffordable expenses. Cart dogs were replaced by people with handcarts. About 150,000 dogs were killed or abandoned. Erica Fudge quotes Hilda Kean:

At the heart of nineteenth-century animal welfare campaigns is the middle-class desire not to be able to see cruelty.

— Hilda Kean, Animal Rights, 1998

The Protection of Animals Act 1911 extended the ban on draft dogs to the rest of the kingdom. As many as 600,000 dogs were killed or abandoned.

The Protection of Animals Act 1911 has since been largely superseded by the Animal Welfare Act 2006, which also superseded and consolidated more than 20 other pieces of legislation, including the Protection of Animals Act 1934 and the Abandonment of Animals Act 1960. The Act introduced a new welfare offense, which means that animal owners have a positive duty of care, and outlaws neglect to provide for their animals' basic needs, such as access to adequate nutrition and veterinary care.

Under the Criminal Damage Act 1971, domestic animals can be classed as property that is capable of being "damaged or destroyed". A charge of criminal damage may be appropriate for the injury or death of an animal owned by someone other than the defendant, and prosecution under the Animal Welfare Act 2006 may also be appropriate.

=== Oceania ===
==== Australia ====
In Australia, all states and territories have enacted legislation governing animal welfare. The legislation is:

- Animal Welfare Act 1992 (ACT)
- Prevention of Cruelty to Animals Act 1979 (NSW)
- Animal Welfare Act (NT)
- Animal Care and Protection Act 2001 (Qld)
- Animal Welfare Act 1985 (SA)
- Animal Welfare Act 1993 (Tas)
- Prevention of Cruelty to Animals Act 1986 (Vic)
- Animal Welfare Act 2002 (WA)

Welfare laws have been criticized as not adequately protecting animals. Whilst police maintain an overall jurisdiction in the prosecution of criminal matters, in many states officers of the RSPCA and other animal welfare charities are accorded authority to investigate and prosecute animal cruelty offenses.

==== New Zealand ====
The Animal Welfare Act 1999 protects animals from maltreatment.

== See also ==
- Bambi effect
- Bear-baiting
- Cat burning
- Crimes against nature
- Crush fetish
- Hunting
- Moral development
- RSPCA
- Goat throwing
- Pain in animals
- Poaching
- Society for the Prevention of Cruelty to Animals
- List of animal welfare organizations
- Animal rights movement

== Sources ==
- Bushaway, Bob (1993), "Bulls, Ballads, Minstrels and Manors: Some Observations on the Defence of Customs in Eighteenth-Century England", in Buckland, Theresa; Wood, Juliette (eds.), Aspects of British Calendar Customs, Sheffield: Sheffield Academic Press, pp. 75–93, ISBN 1-850-75243-5
- Griffin-Kremer, Cozette (2003), "May Day and Mayhem: Portraits of a Holiday in Eighteenth-Century Dublin Ballads", in McKean, Thomas A. (ed.), The Flowering Thorn: International Ballad Studies, Logan: Utah State University Press, pp. 101–128, ISBN 0-87421-491-2
- Malcolmson, Robert W. (1973), Popular Recreations in English Society 1700-1850, London: Cambridge University Press, ISBN 0-521-20147-0
- Peacock, Mabel (1904), "Notes on the Stamford Bull-Running", Folklore, 15 (2): 199–202, doi:10.1080/0015587x.1904.9719402
