= Coming of age =

Young person's transition from childhood to adulthood

Coming of age ceremonies

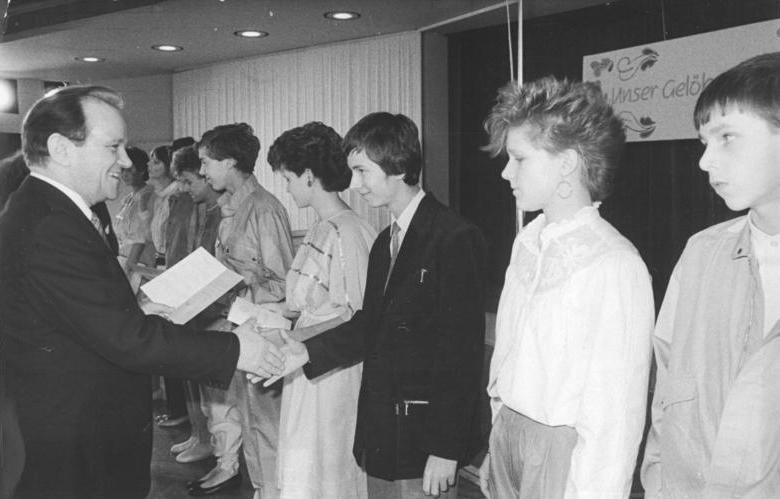
Jugendweihe (East Germany)

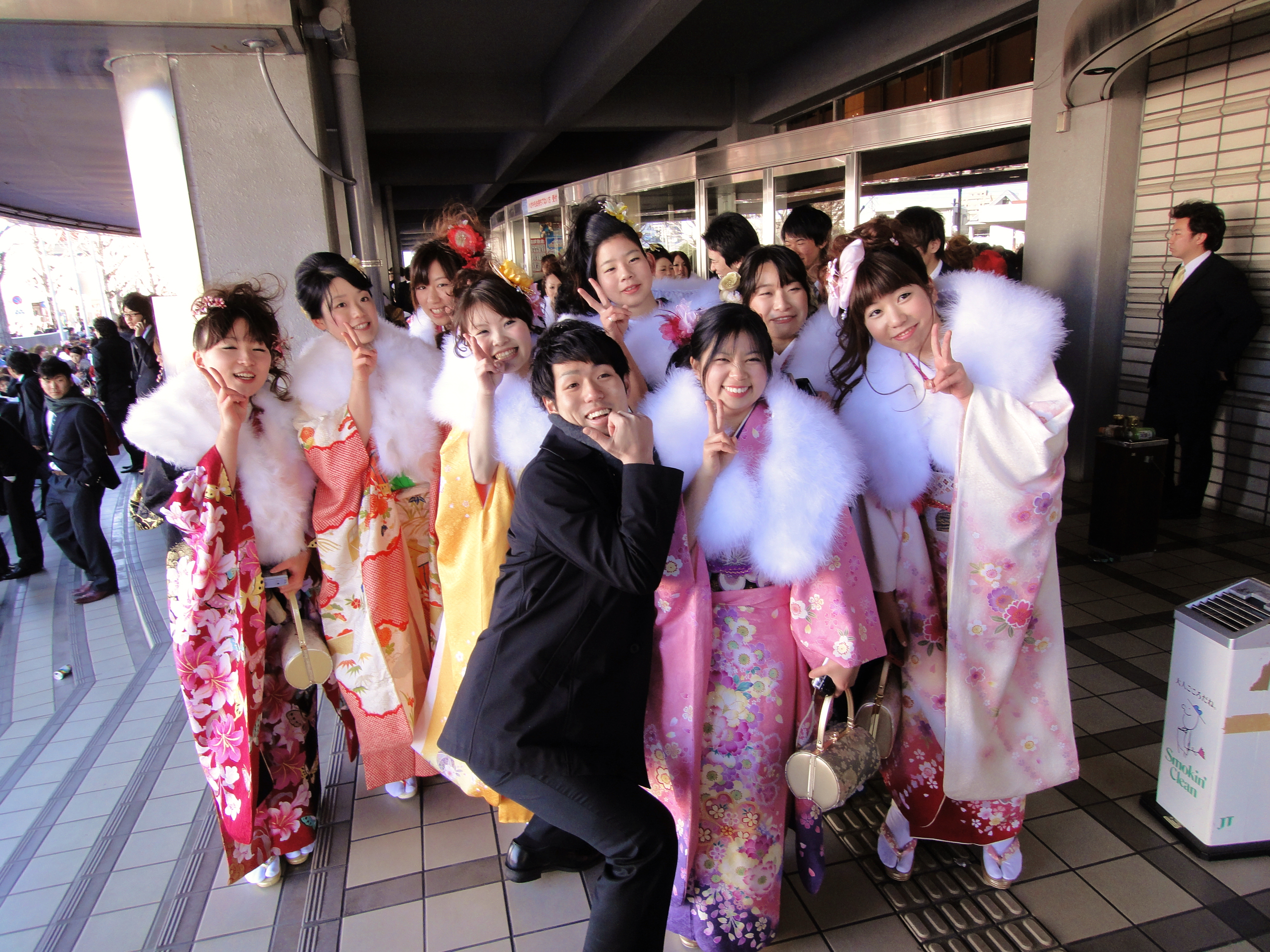
Coming of Age Day (Japan)

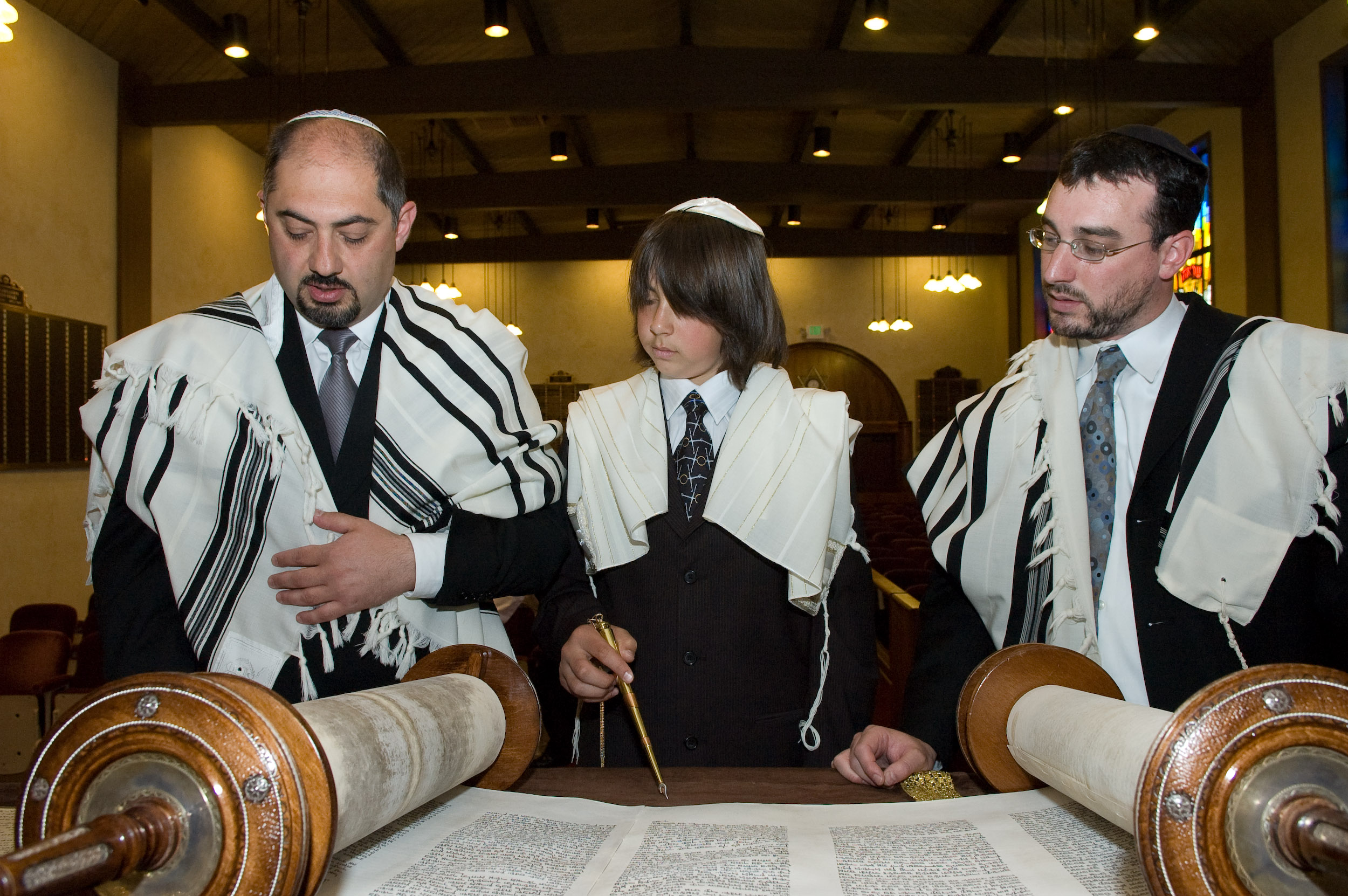
Bar Mitzvah (Judaism)

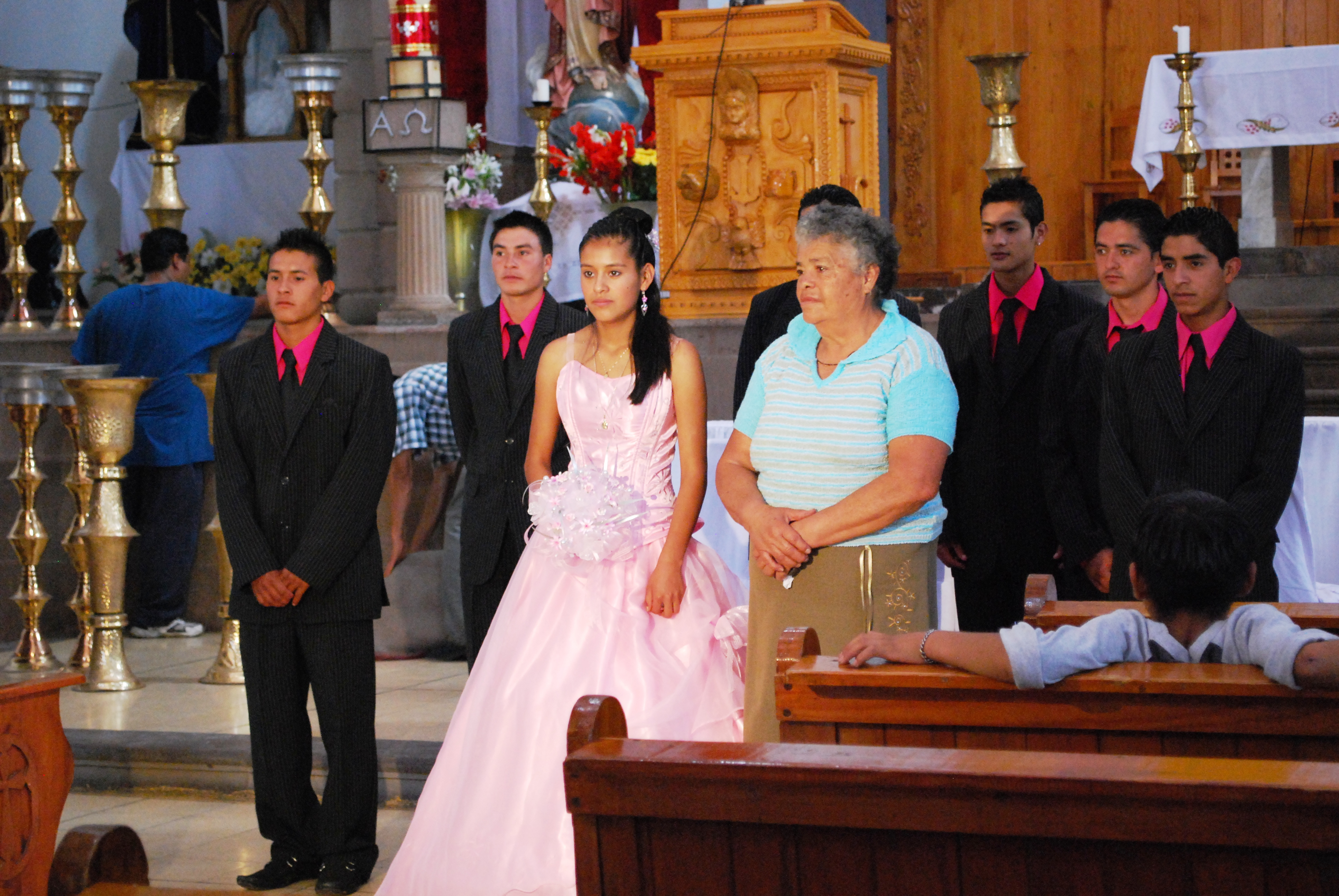
Quinceañera (Latin America)

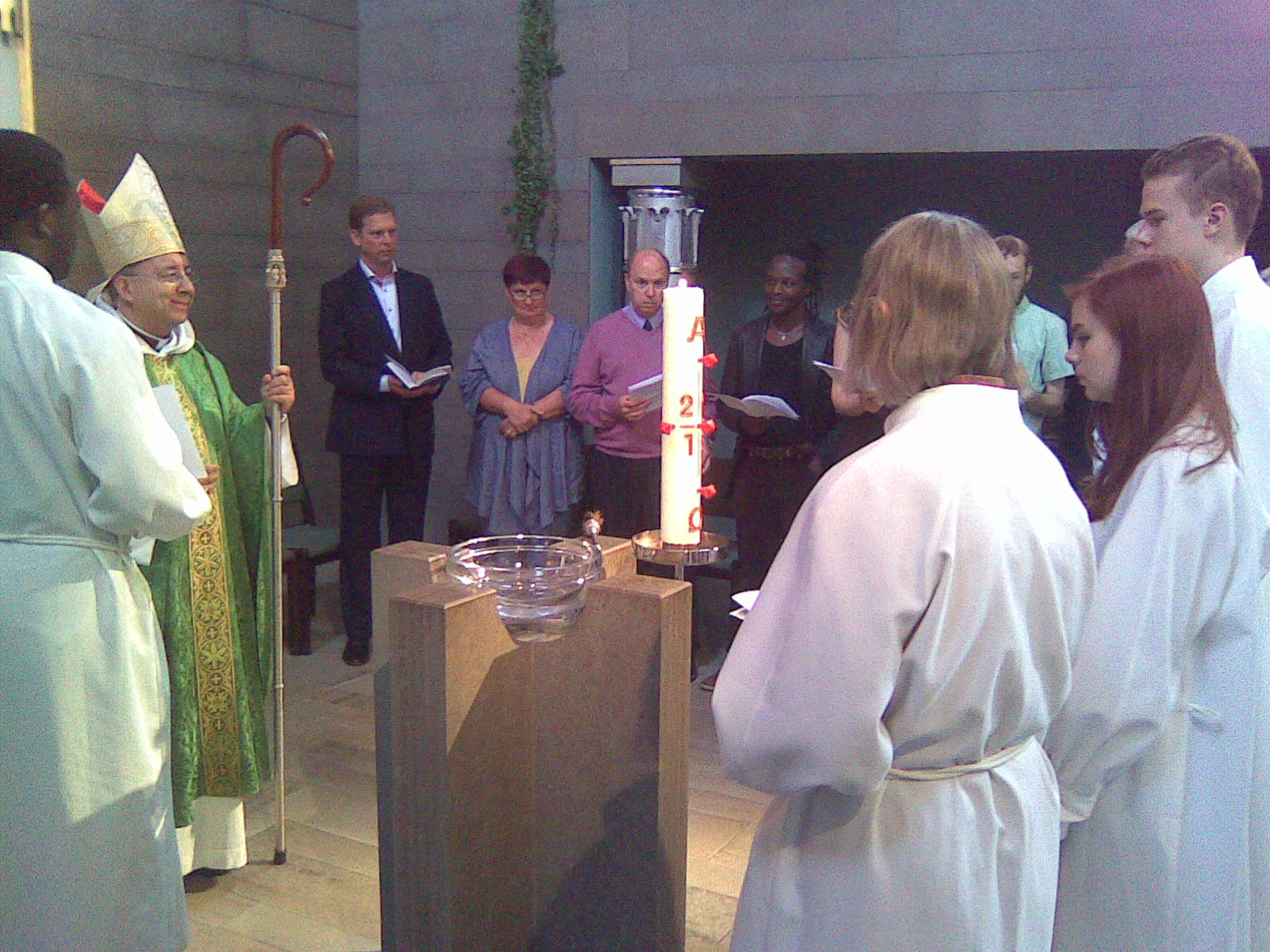
Anglican Confirmation (Helsinki, Finland)

Coming of age is a young person's transition from being a child to being an adult. The specific age at which this transition takes place varies between societies, as does the nature of the change. It can be a simple legal convention or can be part of a ritual or spiritual event.

In the past, and in some societies today, such a change is often associated with the age of sexual maturity (puberty), especially menarche and spermarche. In others, it is associated with an age of religious responsibility.

Particularly in Western societies, modern legal conventions stipulate points around the end of adolescence and the beginning of early adulthood (most commonly 16 and 18 though ranging from 14 to 21) when adolescents are generally no longer considered minors and are granted the full rights and responsibilities of an adult. Some cultures and countries have multiple coming of age ceremonies for multiple ages.

Many cultures retain ceremonies to confirm the coming of age, and coming-of-age stories are a well-established sub-genre in literature, the film industry, and other forms of media.

These ceremonies can represent acceptance into a larger culture, feelings of importance, legal rights and permissions, or entrance into the marriage landscape, depending on the culture.

== Cultural ==
=== Ancient Egypt ===
In ancient Egypt, each gender had its own benchmarks of coming of age, but for both genders the cultural custom of marriage was an important indicator of coming of age. Adult maturation was generally considered a social prerequisite for marrying, and this was measured differently by gender. Females were considered of physical maturity and thus marriage-ready once they had their first menses. However, for males marriage-readiness was indicated by them socially establishing themselves and being able to support a family.

Generally however, the early childhood stage of life was considered to have ended when puberty began. At this point, young Egyptians begin adapting to their respective societal roles. Hence, for example, 14-year-old ancient Egyptians were considered full adults, involved in the traditional activities of adulthood such as work and having a family. A factor in this is ancient Egyptian average lifespan; estimates are that people lived to be around 30 years old. If a child lived past the age of five, they were considered to have evaded most of the mortality risks associated with infancy.

Egyptologist Amandine Marshall stated that

"Some documents hint at a transition between child and adolescence at the age of ten. However, rather than representing reality, this was more a symbolic age; the actual age for the end of childhood varied from one individual to another."

Transitioning into adulthood also came with different opportunities depending on socioeconomic class. For most, readying for adulthood meant participating in an apprenticeship to learn a trade or skill for support oneself. There was general expectation that children would follow in their parents’ footsteps unless they demonstrated some particular talent, like a natural inclination for priestly studies. The middle and upper socioeconomic classes of ancient Egypt were broadly the scribes and nobility. For these children, formal education was typical. The extent of formal education would also vary by gender.

Education and marriage were cornerstone markers in a child's transitioning to adulthood. Marriage, in particular, and the subsequent household founding, was considered the end of the transitional period. Educationally, literacy was regarded as a characteristic of being an adult, so developing literacy signified that the transition from child to adult was occurring.

For males, formal education was completed in their youth. Royal children and other children of higher social status families would receive education focused on government official and military officer training, the latter consisting of the physical education that royal princes receive. A standard for whether a boy was physically prepared to become a soldier is height. A boy was "taken to be a soldier as a child of pole length". One ancient Egyptian pole converted to modern metrics is about 60 centimeters, suggesting under a literal interpretation, that a boy's role as a soldier was from birth. Another interpretation is that this metric converts to 1 meter, which on average, corresponds to an age of about 7 years old. Sons of soldiers would typically follow their fathers into the profession at a very young age. Various physical evidence indicate boys being involved in military at first as errand-boys, and later joining the infantry once a teenager.

=== Ancient Greece ===
In certain states in Ancient Greece, such as Sparta and Crete, adolescent boys were expected to enter into a mentoring relationship with an adult man, in which they would be taught skills pertaining to adult life, such as hunting, martial arts and fine arts.

=== Ancient Rome ===
The puberty ritual for the young Roman male involved shaving his beard and taking off his bulla, an amulet worn to mark and protect underage youth, which he then dedicated to his household gods, the Lares. He assumed the toga virilis ("toga of manhood"), was enrolled as a citizen on the census, and soon began his military service. Traditionally, the ceremony was held on the Liberalia, the festival in honor of the god Liber, who embodied both political and sexual liberty, but other dates could be chosen for individual reasons.

Rome lacked the elaborate female puberty rituals of ancient Greece, and for girls, the wedding ceremony was in part a rite of passage for the bride. Girls coming of age dedicated their dolls to Artemis, the goddess most concerned with virginity, or to Aphrodite when they were preparing for marriage. All adolescents in ritual preparation to transition to adult status wore the tunica recta, the "upright tunic", but girls wove their own. The garment was called recta because it was woven by tradition on a type of upright loom that had become archaic in later periods.

Roman girls were expected to remain virgins until marriage, but boys were often introduced to heterosexual behaviors by a prostitute. The higher the social rank of a girl, the sooner she was likely to become betrothed and married. The general age of betrothal for girls of the upper classes was fourteen, but for patricians as early as twelve. Weddings, however, were often postponed until the girl was considered mature enough. Males typically postponed marriage till they had served in the military for some time and were beginning their political careers, around age 25. Patrician males, however, might marry considerably earlier; Julius Caesar was married for the first time by the age of 18.

On the night before the wedding, the bride bound up her hair with a yellow hairnet she had woven. The confining of her hair signifies the harnessing of her sexuality within marriage. Her weaving of the tunica recta and the hairnet demonstrated her skill and her capacity for acting in the traditional matron's role as custos domi, "guardian of the house". On her wedding day, she belted her tunic with the cingulum, made from the wool of an ewe to symbolize fertility, and tied with the "knot of Hercules", which was supposed to be hard to untie. The knot symbolized wifely chastity, in that it was to be untied only by her husband, but the cingulum also symbolized that the bridegroom "was belted and bound" to his wife. The bride's hair was ritually styled in "six tresses" (seni crines), and she was veiled until uncovered by her husband at the end of the ceremony, a ritual of surrendering her virginity to him.

=== Anglo-Celtic ===
The legal age of majority is 18 in most Anglo-Celtic cultures (such as Australia, New Zealand, and Ireland). One is legally enabled to vote, purchase tobacco and alcohol, marry without parental consent (although one can wed at 16 in New Zealand with consent of family court) and sign contracts. But in the early twentieth century, the age of legal majority was 21, although the marriageable age was typically lower. Even though turning 21 now has few, if any, legal effects in most of these countries, its former legal status as the age of majority has caused it to continue to be celebrated.

=== Brazil ===
In the Sateré-Mawé tribe of the Brazilian Amazon, young boys celebrate their coming of age at 13 where they participate in the Bullet Ant Initiation. During this ceremony, the boys go out and search for bullet ants, and the ants are sedated. Then, the ants are woven into gloves so that their stingers are facing inwards- towards the skin. When the ants wake up, they're furious. The boys then have to wear the gloves for 20 minutes to prove their manhood. They will do this 20 times over the course of many months for the initiation to be finished. Any scream or cry is seen as a sign of weakness.

=== Canada ===
In Canada, a person aged 16 and over can legally drive a car and work, but is only considered to be an adult at the age of 18. In most provinces, the legal age to purchase alcohol and cigarettes is 19, except in Alberta, Manitoba, and Quebec where it is 18 years old.

=== India ===
In India, a person aged 18 and over is allowed to own and drive a car, and has attained the right to vote and the age of consent. Inspired by the western cultures however there are usually sweet sixteen birthday parties celebrated across the country but with little cultural significance besides having now become a young adult. The drinking age varies within states from 18 to 21 years old. However, in various cultures across India, menarche is celebrated. There are various rituals depending on the region, celebrating the onsite of a girl transitioning into a woman.

=== Indonesia ===
In Bali, the coming of age ceremony is supposed to take place after a girl's first menstrual period or a boy's voice breaks. However, due to expense, it is often delayed until later. The upper canines are filed down slightly to symbolize the effacing of the individual's "wild" nature. While in Nias island, a young man must jump up over a stone (normally about 1 or 2 meters) as a part of the coming of age ceremony.

=== Japan ===
Since 1948, the age of majority in Japan has been 20; persons under 20 are not permitted to smoke or drink. Until June 2016, people under 20 were not permitted to vote. The government of Japan lowered the age of majority to 18, which came into effect in 2021. Coming-of-age ceremonies, known as seijin shiki, are held on the second Monday of January. At the ceremony, all of the men and women participating are brought to a government building and listen to many speakers, similar to a graduation ceremony. At the conclusion of the ceremony government officials give speeches, and small presents are handed out to the new adults.

=== Korea ===
In Korea, citizens are permitted to marry, vote, drive, drink alcohol, and smoke at age 19.

The Monday of the third week of May is "coming-of-age day". There has been a traditional coming of age ceremony since before the Goryeo dynasty, but it has mostly disappeared. In the traditional way, when boys or girls were between the ages of fifteen and twenty, boys wore gat, a Korean traditional hat made of bamboo and horsehair, and girls did their hair in a chignon with a binyeo, a Korean traditional ornamental hairpin. Both of them wore hanbok, which are sometimes worn at the coming of age ceremony in the present day.

=== Latin America ===
In some Spanish-speaking Latin American countries, girls reaching the age of 15 will participate in a Quinceañera, a large and expensive party as a marker of coming of age. A similar celebration, known as Baile de Debutantes (debutante ball) or Festa de 15 (party of 15), occurs in Brazil. The legal age of adulthood varies by country.

=== Papua New Guinea ===
Kovave is a ceremony to initiate Papua New Guinea boys into adult society. It involves dressing up in a conical hat which has long strands of leaves hanging from the edge, down to below the waist. The name Kovave is also used to describe the head-dress.

=== Philippines ===
In the Philippines, a popular coming of age celebration for 18-year-old women is the debut. It is normally a formal affair, with a strict dress code such as a coat and tie for the upper-middle and upper classes, and usually has a theme or color scheme that is related to the dress code. The débutante traditionally chooses for her entourage "18 Roses", who are 18 special men or boys in the girl's life such as boyfriends, relatives and brothers, and "18 Candles", who are the Roses' female counterparts. Each presents a rose or candle then delivers a short speech about the debutante. The Roses sometimes dance with the débutante before presenting their flower and speech, with the last being her father or boyfriend. Other variations exist, such as 18 Treasures (of any gender; gives a present instead of a candle or flower) or other types of flowers aside from roses being given, but the significance of "18" is almost always retained.

Filipino men, on the other hand, celebrate their debut on their 21st birthday. There is no traditionally set program marking this event, and celebrations differ from family to family. Both men and women may opt not to hold a debut at all.

=== Romani ===
In the Romani culture, males are called Shave when they come of age at 20, and females Sheya. Males are then taught to drive and work in their family's line of trade, while females are taught the women's line of work.

=== Scandinavian and Slavic ===
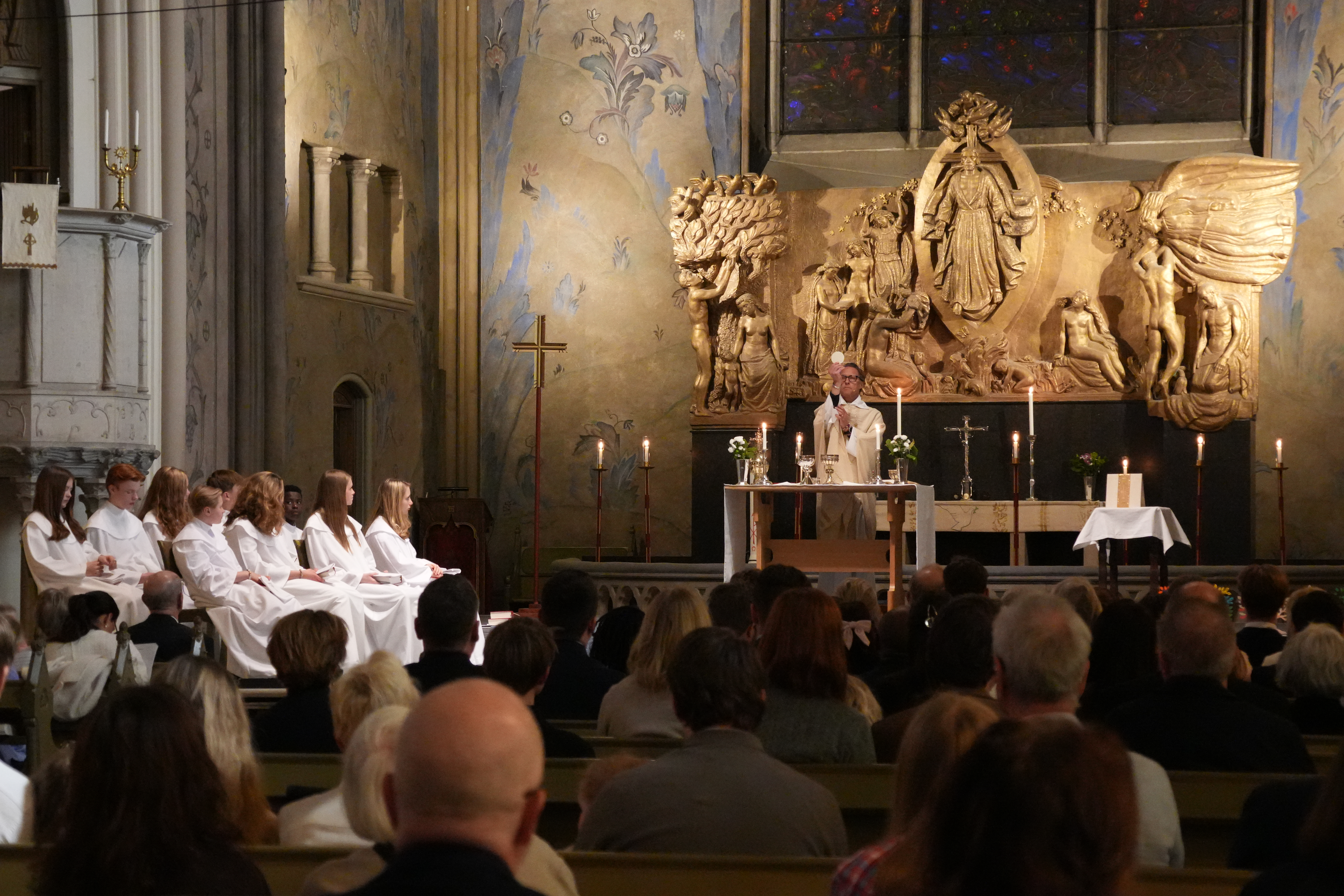
An Evangelical-Lutheran priest of the Church of Sweden elevates the host before the congregation during a Confirmation Mass at Oscar's Church on the Third Sunday of Eastertide.

In Ukraine, Poland, and the Scandinavian Countries, the legal coming of age of a person is celebrated at either 18 or 21, though years earlier, the transition to adulthood is celebrated ecclesiastically. In Scandinavia, where Evangelical-Lutheran Christianity predominates, confirmation is an important event that marks the coming of age. Later, another coming of age event in Sweden is the graduation from a gymnasium, known as studenten. The graduation is preceded and succeeded by several traditional events, such as the wearing of a graduation cap, a ball, the champagne breakfast and other festivities on the day of graduation.

=== South Africa ===
In South Africa, the Xhosa Ulwaluko and the Sotho Lebollo la banna circumcision and manhood ceremonies are still undertaken by the majority of males.

=== Spain ===
In Spain during the 19th century, there was a civilian coming of age bound to the compulsory military service. The quintos were the boys of the village that reached the age of eligibility for military service (18 years), thus forming the quinta of a year. In rural Spain, the mili was the first and sometimes the only experience of life away from family. In the days before their departure, the quintos knocked on every door to ask for food and drink. They held a common festive meal with what they gathered and sometimes painted some graffiti reading Vivan los quintos del año as a memorial of their leaving their youth. Years later, the quintos of the same year could still hold yearly meals to remember times past. By the end of the 20th century, the rural exodus, the diffusion of city customs and the loss of prestige of military service changed the relevance of quintos parties. In some places, the party included the village girls of the same age, thus becoming less directly related to military service. In others, the tradition was simply lost.

In 2002, conscription was abolished in Spain in favor of an all-professional military. As a result, the quintos disappeared except for a few rural areas where it is kept as a coming of age traditional party without further consequences. In Manganeses de la Polvorosa, province of Zamora, the quintos dropped a live goat from the local belfry on a January Sunday. After pressure from animal-rights activists, that part of the festival has been banned.

=== United Kingdom ===
In the United Kingdom, the legal drinking, smoking, and voting age is 18. This is also when citizens are legally considered an adult. The UK was the first country to lower these restrictions to age 18.

=== United States ===
In the United States, people are allowed to drive at 16 in all states, with the exception of New Jersey, which requires drivers to be 17 and older, and sometimes receive the responsibility of owning their own car. People are allowed to drive at age 15 in Idaho and Montana. At 16, people are also legally allowed to donate blood and work in most establishments. In spite of this, it is not until the age of 18 that a person is legally considered an adult and can vote and join the military (age 17 with parental consent). The legal age for purchasing and consuming alcohol, tobacco, (and, in states where it is legal, recreational marijuana) is 21. Multiple localities have also raised the minimum purchase age independent of state laws.

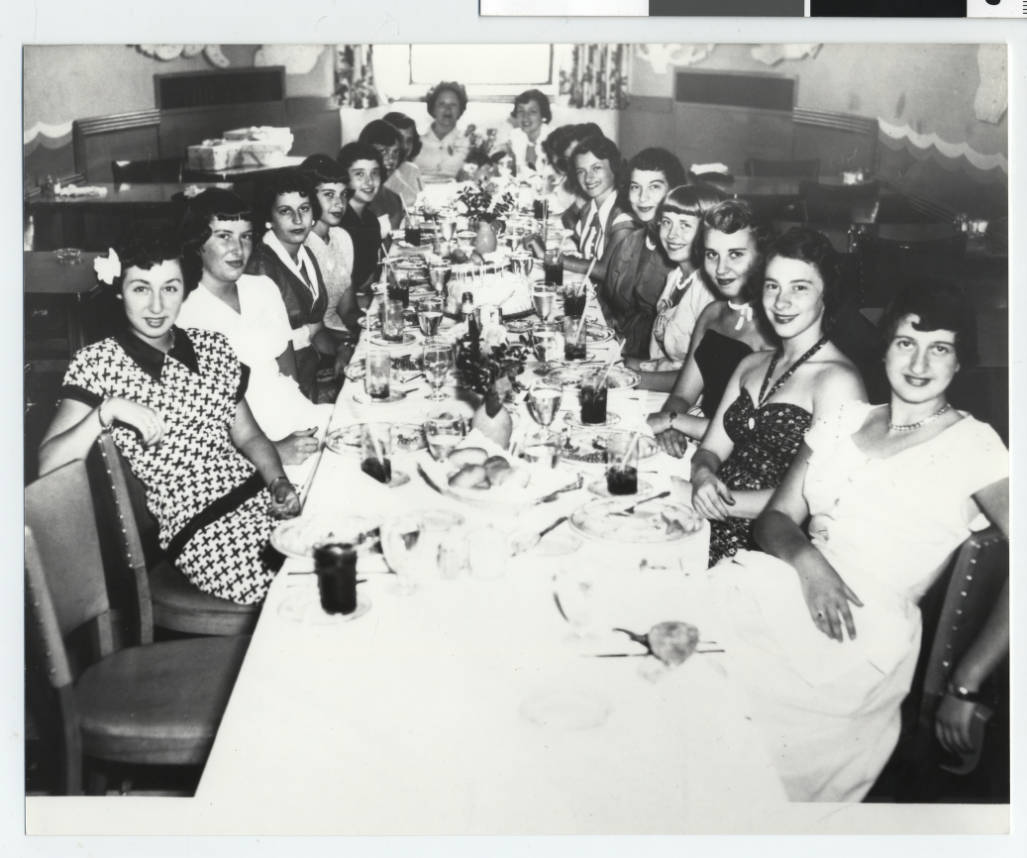
Sweet Sixteen Birthday Party at The Rainbow Cafe in Minneapolis, MN, 1949

Although the US consists of and continues to practice the cultures of the many countries that make it up, something unique to the country is the "Sweet Sixteen". This tradition is also widely celebrated in Canada. The tradition that is known today as the American Sweet Sixteen dates back to the early-mid 20th century. These parties represent not necessarily adulthood, but being a more mature teenager. The guest of honor is primarily a girl, and are more common among wealthier families due to how expensive the parties can be. Because of this, they are considered to be the fanciest party one can experience while in their childhood. The guest of honor wears an extravagant ball gown, sometimes accompanied with a crown. Sweet Sixteen parties vary by person, but they often consist of a DJ or a band, dancing, a rented out venue, and food and drink bars. In the late 20th century, when women began gaining more rights and started fighting for liberation, Sweet Sixteens began to be questioned. Since they have correlation to the debutante ball, another coming of age ceremony that taught women to adhere to their gender roles by handing them over to the men of the community, they were largely rejected in the era of women's liberation. In modern times, the 16th birthday has less significance than it did before, but some do still participate in this celebration. Some movies that depict Sweet Sixteens are "Sixteen Candles" (1984), and "16 Wishes" (2010).

=== Vietnam ===
During the feudal period, the coming of age was celebrated at 15 for noblemen. Nowadays, the age is 20 for both genders.

== Religious ==
=== Baha'i ===
Turning 15, the "age of maturity", as the Baha'i faith terms it, is a time when a child is considered spiritually mature. Declared Baha'is that have reached the age of maturity are expected to begin observing certain Baha'i laws, such as obligatory prayer and fasting.

=== Buddhism ===
Theravada boys, typically just under the age of 20 years, undergo a Shinbyu ceremony, where they are initiated into the Temple as Novice Monks (Samanera). They will typically stay in the monastery for between 3 days and 3 years, most commonly for one 3-month "rainy season retreat" (vassa), held annually from late July to early October. During this period the boys experience the rigors of an orthodox Buddhist monastic lifestyle – a lifestyle that involves celibacy, formal voluntary poverty, absolute nonviolence, and daily fasting between noon and the following day's sunrise.

Depending on how long they stay, the boys will learn various chants and recitations in the canonical language (Pali) – typically the Buddha's more famous discourses (Suttas) and verses (Gathas) – as well as Buddhist ethics and higher monastic discipline (Vinaya). If they stay long enough and conditions permit, they may be tutored in the meditative practices (bhavana, or dhyana) that are at the heart of Buddhism's program for the self-development of alert tranquillity (samadhi), wisdom (prajna), and divine mental states (brahmavihara).

After living the novitiate monastic life for some time, the boy, now considered to have "come of age", will either take higher ordination as a fully ordained monk (a bhikkhu) or will (more often) return to lay life. In Southeast Asian countries, where most practitioners of Theravada Buddhism reside, women will often refuse to marry a man who has not ordained temporarily as a Samanera in this way at some point in his life. Men who have completed this Samanera ordination and have returned to lay life are considered primed for adult married life and are described in the Thai language and the Khmer language by terms which roughly translate as "cooked", "finished", or "cooled off" in English, as in meal preparation/consumption. Thus, one's monastic training is seen to have prepared one properly for familial, social, and civic duty and/or one's passions and unruliness of the boy are seen to have "cooled down" enough for him to be of use to a woman as a proper man.

=== Christianity ===
In many Western Christian churches (those deriving from Rome after the East-West Schism), a young person is eligible to receive confirmation, which is considered a sacrament in Catholicism, and a rite in Lutheranism, Anglicanism, Methodism, Irvingism, and Reformed Christianity. The Catholic and Methodist denominations teach that in confirmation, the Holy Spirit strengthens a baptized individual for their faith journey. This is usually done by a bishop or an abbot laying their hands upon the foreheads of the young person (usually between the ages of 12 and 15 years), and marking them with the seal of the Holy Spirit. In some Christian denominations, the confirmand (now an adult in the eyes of the Church) takes a Saint's name as a confirmation name.

In Christian denominations that practice Believer's Baptism (baptism by voluntary decision, as opposed to baptism in early infancy), it is normatively carried out after the age of accountability has arrived, as with many Anabaptist denominations, such as the Mennonites. Some traditions withhold the rite of Holy Communion from those not yet at the age of accountability, on the grounds that children do not understand what the sacrament means. In the 20th century, Roman Catholic children began to be admitted to communion some years before confirmation, with an annual First Communion service – a practice that was extended to some paedobaptist Protestant groups, such as Lutheranism and Anglicanism–but since the Second Vatican Council, the withholding of confirmation to a later age, e.g. mid-teens in the United States, early teens in Ireland and Britain, has in some areas been abandoned in favour of restoring the traditional order of the three sacraments of initiation.

In some denominations, full membership in the Church, if not bestowed at birth, often must wait until the age of accountability and frequently is granted only after a period of preparation known as catechesis. The time of innocence before one has the ability to understand truly the laws of God and that God sees one as innocent is also seen as applying to individuals who suffer from a mental disability which prevents them from ever reaching a time when they are capable of understanding the laws of God. These individuals are thus seen, according to some Christians, as existing in a perpetual state of innocence.

==== Catholicism ====
In 1910, Pope Pius X issued the decree Quam singulari, which changed the age of eligibility for receiving both the sacrament of Penance and the Eucharist to a "time when a child begins to reason, that is about the seventh year, more or less". Previously, local standards had been at least 10 or 12 or even 14 years old. Historically, the sacrament of confirmation has been administered to youth who have reached the "age of discretion". The catechism states that confirmation should be received "at the appropriate time", but in danger of death it can be administered to children. Together with the sacraments of baptism and the Eucharist, the sacrament of confirmation completes the sacraments of Christian initiation, "for without Confirmation and Eucharist, Baptism is certainly valid and efficacious, but Christian initiation remains incomplete."

In Eastern Catholic Churches, infants receive confirmation and communion immediately after baptism. In Eastern Christianity the baptising priest confirms infants directly after baptism.

==== The Church of Jesus Christ of Latter-Day Saints ====
The Church of Jesus Christ of Latter-day Saints sets the age of accountability and minimum age for baptism at 8 years of age. All persons younger than 8 are considered innocent and not accountable for their sinning. The Church considers mentally challenged individuals whose mental age is under 8 to be in a perpetual state of innocence, while other doctrines teach that no one is 'without sin', both believe that those at a certain age are considered innocent.

=== Confucianism ===
According to the Grand Historian, the Duke of Zhou wrote the Rites of Zhou about 3000 years ago, which documented fundamental ceremonies in ancient China, including the Coming of Age rite. Then Confucius and his students wrote the Book of Rites, which introduced and further explained important ceremonies in Confucianism. When a man turned 20, his parents would hold a Guan Li (also named the capping ceremony); when a girl turned 15, she would receive a Ji Li (also known as the Hairpin Ceremony). These rites were considered to represent a person being mature and prepared to get married and start a family; therefore, they were the beginning of all the moral rites.

During this rite of passage, the young person receives his/her style name.

=== Hinduism ===
In Hinduism coming of age generally signifies that a boy or girl is mature enough to understand his responsibility towards family and society. Some castes in Hinduism also have the sacred thread ceremony, called Upanayana, for Dvija (twice-born) boys that mark their coming of age to do religious ceremonies. A rite of passage males have to go through is Bhrataman (or Chudakarma) that marks adulthood.

=== Ifá ===
In the traditional Ifá faith of the Yoruba people of West Africa and the many New World religions that it subsequently gave birth to, men and women are often initiated to the service of one of the hundreds of subsidiary spirits that serve the Orisha Olodumare, the group's conception of the Almighty God. The mystic links that are forged by way of these initiations, which typically occur at puberty, are the conduits that are used by adherents to attempt to achieve what can be seen as the equivalent of the Buddhist enlightenment by way of a combination of personalized meditations, reincarnations and spirit possessions.

=== Islam ===
Children are not required to perform any obligatory religious obligations prior to reaching the age of puberty, although they are encouraged to begin praying at the age of seven. Once a person begins puberty, they are required to perform salat and other obligations of Islam.

Muslims are considered adults when they have hit puberty. For girls, this is often when they first begin menstruating, and boys when they experience nocturnal emission or the growth of pubic hair. However, if either gender does not exhibit their respective signs, then they will be considered adults at age fifteen. The evidence for this is the narration of Ibn Umar that he said: "Allah's Apostle called me to present myself in front of him on the eve of the battle of Uhud, while I was fourteen years of age at that time and he did not allow me to take part in that battle but he called me in front of him on the eve of the battle of the Trench when I was fifteen years old, and he allowed me to join the battle." (Reported by Bukhari and Muslim). When Umar Ibn Abdul Aziz heard this Hadith he made this age the evidence to differentiate between a mature and an immature person.

In some Islamic cultures circumcision (khitan) can be a ritual associated with coming of age for boys, taking place in late childhood or early adolescence.

=== Judaism ===
In the Jewish faith, boys reach religious maturity at the age of thirteen and become a bar mitzvah ("bar mitzvah" means "son of the commandment" literally, and "subject to commandments" figuratively). Girls mature a year earlier, and become a bat mitzvah ("bat mitzvah" means "daughter of the commandment") at twelve. The new men and women are looked upon as adults and are expected to uphold the Jewish commandments and laws. Also, in religious court they are adults and can marry with their new title of an adult. Nonetheless, in the Talmud; Pirkei Avot (5:25), Rabbi Yehuda ben Teime gives the age of 18 as the appropriate age to get married. At the end of the bar or bat mitzvah, the boy or girl is showered with candies, which act as "sweet blessings". Besides the actual ceremony, there usually is a bar or bat mitzvah party.

==== Chassidim ====
In various Chassidic sects when boys turn 3 years of age, they have an upsherin (sect related typical Brooklin-Yiddish for Yiddish Abshern, for German Abscheren, "Haare schneiden", engl. hair cut, lit. 'to sheer away') ceremony, when they receive their first haircut. Until then, their parents allow their hair to grow long, until they undergo this esoteric rite. Little girls for the first time co-light some extra ″Shabbat candles, after their mothers did so, also when they turn 3 years of age.

=== Secular Humanist ===
In some countries, Humanist or freethinker organisations have arranged courses or camps for non-religious adolescents, in which they can study or work on ethical, social, and personal topics important for adult life, followed by a formal rite of passage comparable to the Christian Confirmation. Some of these ceremonies are even called "civil confirmations". The purpose of these ceremonies is to offer a festive ritual for those youngsters, who do not believe in any religion, but nevertheless want to mark their transition from childhood to adulthood.

=== Shinto ===
In the Shinto faith, boys were taken to the shrine of their patron deity at approximately 12–14 years old. They were then given adult clothes and a new haircut. This was called Genpuku.

=== Sikhism ===
In Sikhism, when one reaches the age of maturity, the men will typically partake in a ceremony called Dastar Bandhi. This is the first time the proper Sikh Turban is tied on the adolescent. Women who wear the turban may also partake in the ceremony, although it is less common.

== See also ==
- Adolescence
- Age of consent
- Age of majority
- Age of Majority (Catholic Church)
- Bildungsroman
- Coming of Age (Unitarian Universalism)
- Coming-of-age story
- Defense of infancy § The age of criminal responsibility
- Manhood
- Person (Catholic canon law) § Age of majority
- Poy Sang Long
- Quinceañera (age 15)
- Rite of passage
- Self-discovery
- Suitable age and discretion
- Sweet sixteen (birthday)
- Coming of Age in Samoa
