= Vincent of Saragossa =

Saint and martyr

Saint Vincent of Saragossa
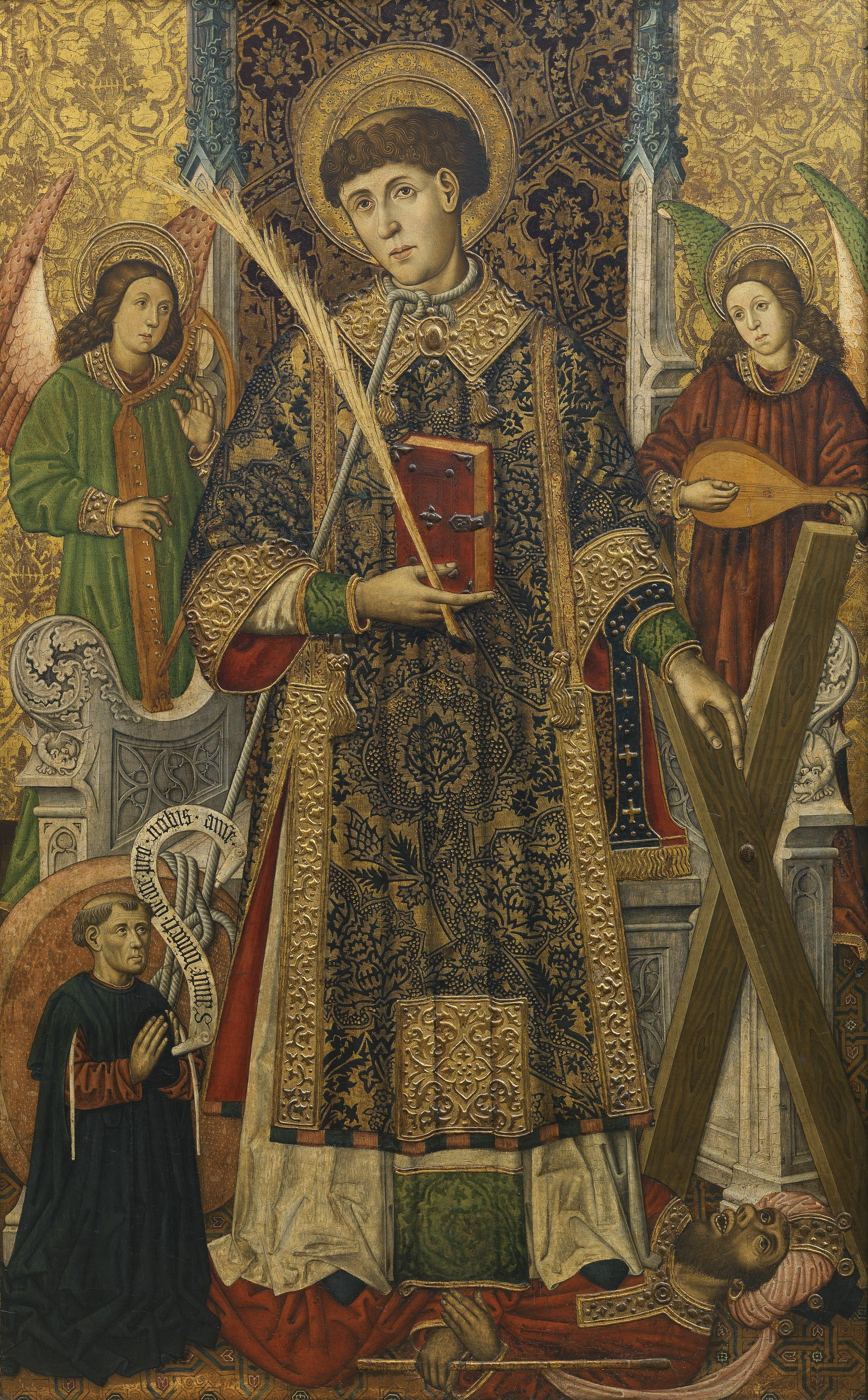
- 15th-century painting of Vincent by Tomás Giner.

Martyr
- Born: 3rd century Osca, Hispania Tarraconensis (now Huesca, Spain)
- Died: c. 304; Valentia, Hispania Tarraconensis (now Valencia, Spain)
- Venerated in: Catholic Church; Anglican Communion; Eastern Orthodox Church
- Canonized: Pre-Congregation
- Feast: 22 January (Catholic, Eastern Orthodox & Anglican Churches); 11 November (Eastern Orthodox Church additional feast day)
- Attributes: deacon's dalmatic, ship, ravens
- Patronage: São Vicente, Lisbon; Algarve; Valencia; Vicenza, Italy, vignerons (wine-makers), vintners (wine-merchants), vinegar-makers; Order of Deacons of the Catholic Diocese of Bergamo

Vincent of Saragossa (also known as Vincent Martyr, Vincent of Huesca or Vincent the Deacon) was a deacon of the Church of Zaragoza (older: Saragossa). He is considered as a Protomartyr of Spain and the patron saint of Lisbon, Algarve, and Valencia. His feast day is 22 January in the Catholic Church, Anglican Communion, and the Eastern Orthodox Church, with an additional commemoration on 11 November in the Eastern Orthodox Church. Vincent was born at Huesca and martyred under the Emperor Diocletian around the year 304.

== Biography ==
The earliest account of Vincent's martyrdom is in a carmen (lyric poem) written by the poet Prudentius, who wrote a series of lyric poems, Peristephanon ("Crowns of Martyrdom"), on Hispanic and Roman martyrs.

He was born at Huesca, near Zaragoza, in Spain sometime during the latter part of the 3rd century. It is believed his father was Eutricius (Euthicius), and his mother was Enola, a native of Osca (Huesca).

Vincent spent most of his life in the city of Zaragoza, where he was educated and ordained to the diaconate by Bishop Valerius of Saragossa, who commissioned Vincent to preach throughout the diocese. Because Valerius suffered from a speech impediment, Vincent acted as his spokesman.

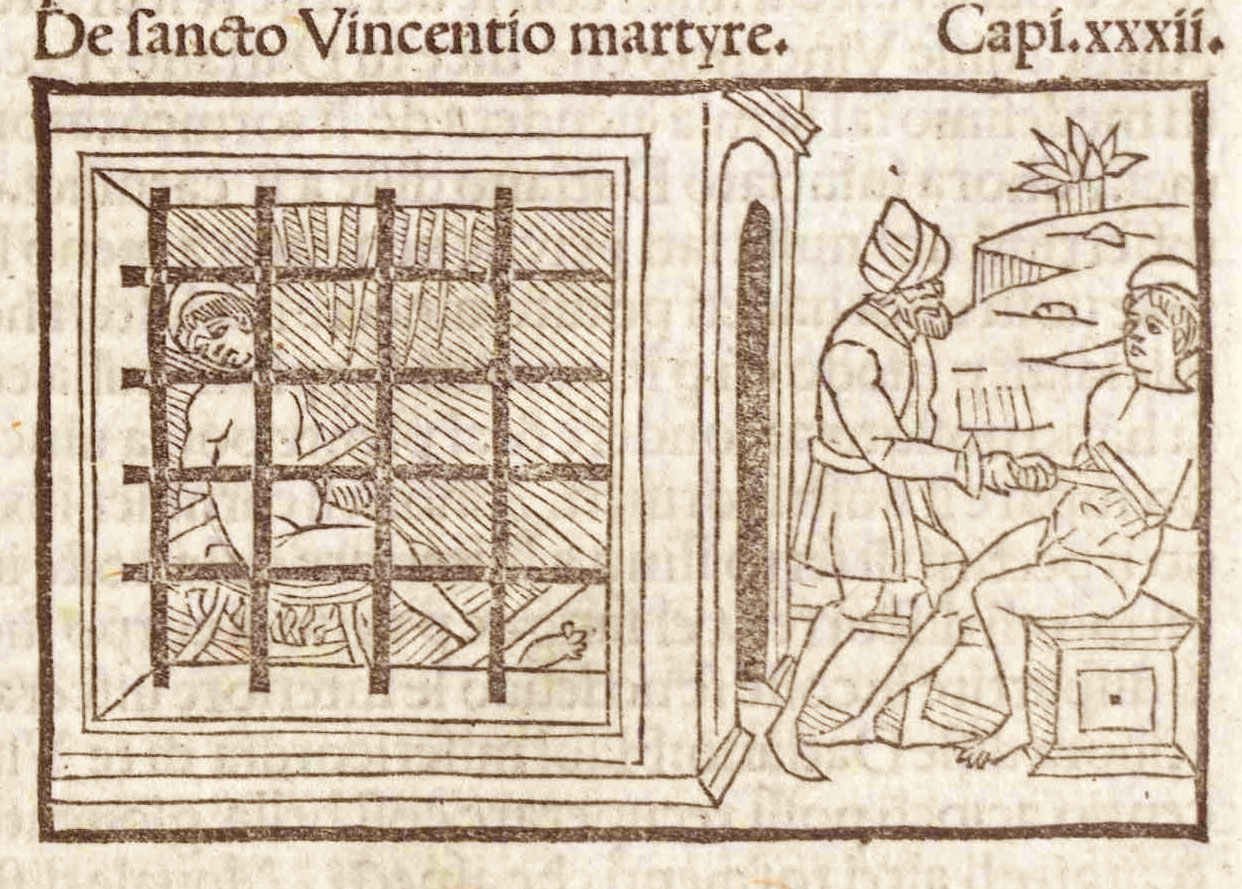
The martyrdom of Vincent in the Golden Legend (1497)

When the Roman Emperor Diocletian began persecuting Christians in Spain, both were brought before the Roman governor, Dacian, in Valencia. Vincent and his bishop Valerius were confined to the prison of Valencia. Though he was finally offered release if he would consign Scripture to the fire, Vincent refused. Speaking on behalf of his bishop, he informed the judge that they were ready to suffer everything for their faith, and that they could pay no heed either to threats or promises.

His outspoken manner so angered the governor that he had every sort of torture inflicted on Vincent. He was stretched on the rack and his flesh torn with iron hooks. Then his wounds were rubbed with salt and he was burned alive upon a red-hot gridiron. Finally, he was cast into prison and laid on a floor scattered with broken pottery, where he died. During his martyrdom he preserved such peace and tranquillity that it astonished his jailer, who repented from his sins and was converted. Vincent's dead body was thrown into the sea in a sack, but was later recovered by the Christians and his veneration immediately spread throughout the church. The aged bishop Valerius was exiled.

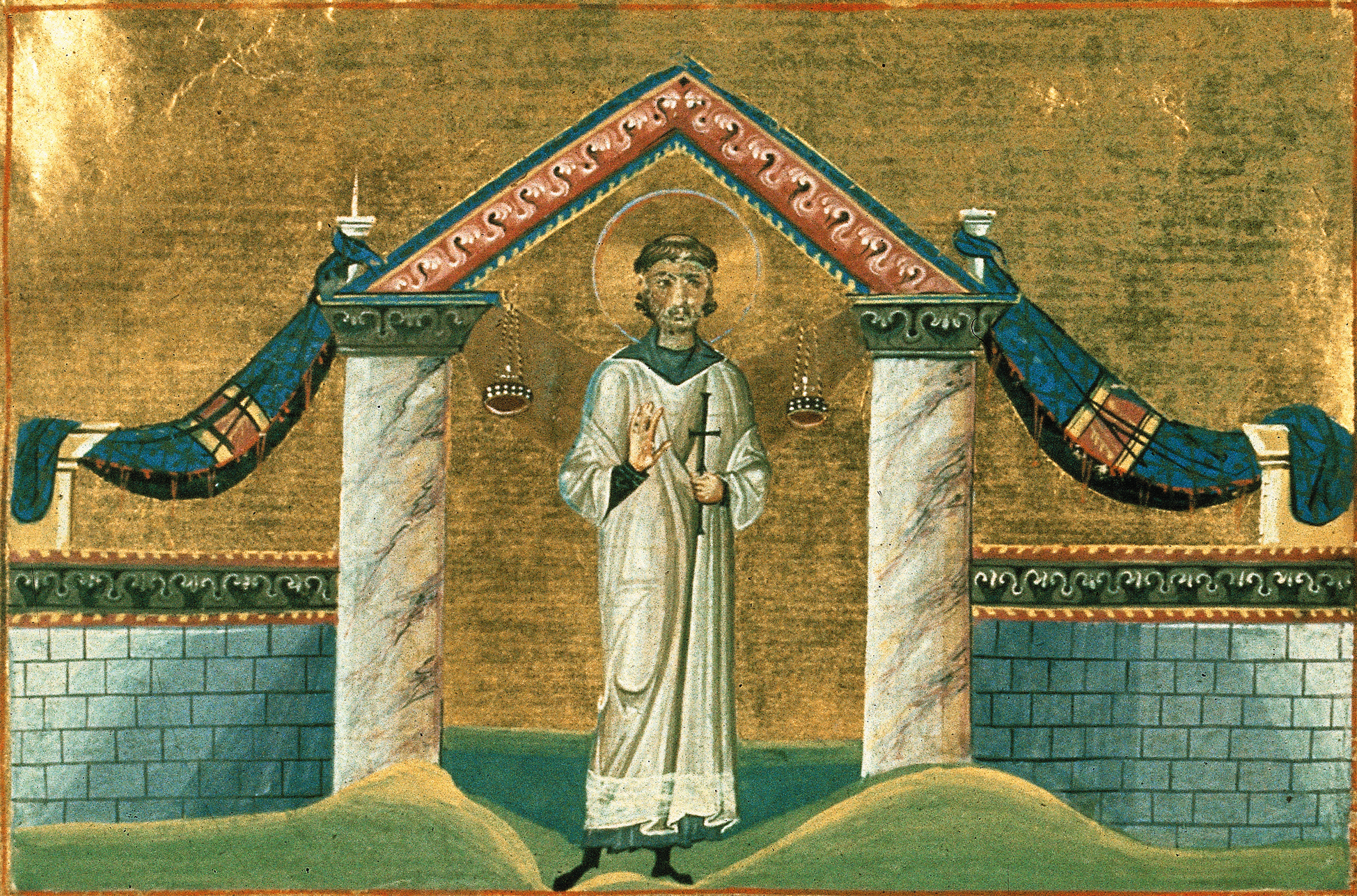
St. Vincent of Saragossa (Menologion of Basil II, 10th century)

The story that Vincent was tortured on a gridiron is perhaps adapted from the martyrdom of another son of Huesca, Lawrence— Vincent, like many early martyrs in the early hagiographic literature, succeeded in converting his jailer.

According to legend, after being martyred, ravens protected Vincent's body from being devoured by vultures, until his followers could recover the body. His body was taken to what is now known as Cape St. Vincent where a shrine was erected over his grave, guarded by flocks of ravens. In the time of Muslim rule in the Iberian Peninsula, the Arab geographer Al-Idrisi noted this constant guard by ravens, for which the place was named by him كنيسة الغراب "Kanīsah al-Ghurāb" (Church of the Raven). King Afonso I of Portugal (1139–1185) had Vincent's body exhumed in 1173 and brought it by ship to the Lisbon Cathedral. This transfer of the relics is depicted on the coat of arms of Lisbon.

== Legacy and veneration ==
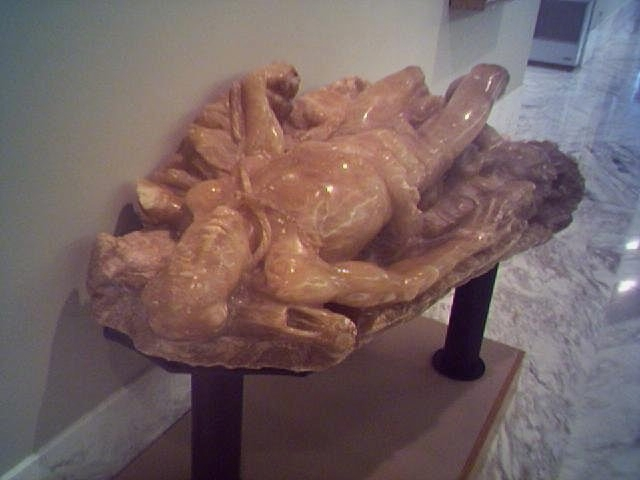
Saint Vincent Martyr thrown into the dung heap

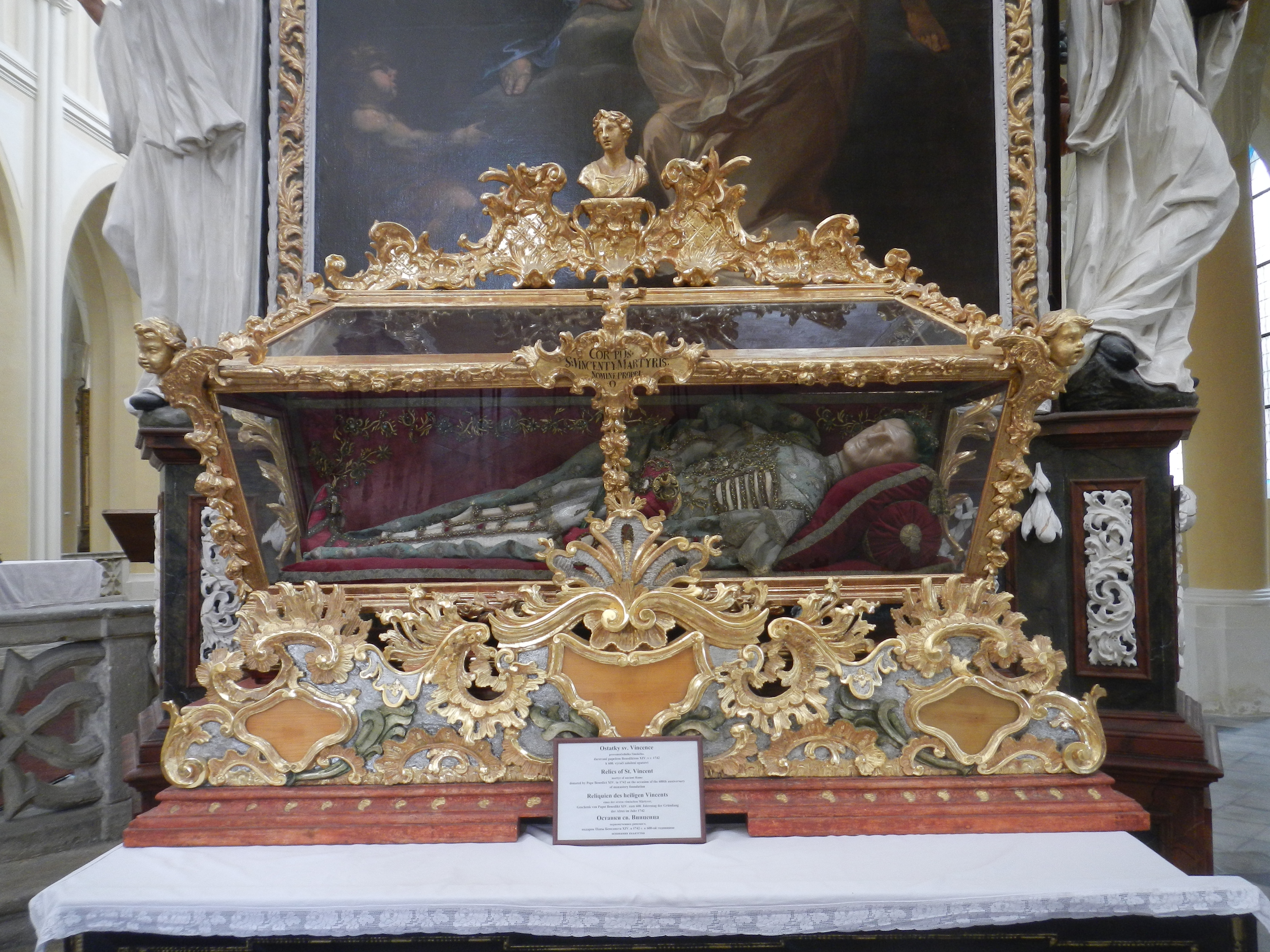
Relics of St. Vincent in the Church of the Assumption of Our Lady and Saint John the Baptist, Kutná Hora, Czechia

Three elaborated hagiographies, all based ultimately on a lost 5th-century Passion, circulated in the Middle Ages. His "Acts" have been "rather freely colored by the imagination of their compiler".

Though Vincent's tomb in Valencia became the earliest center of his cult, he was also honoured at his birthplace and his reputation spread from Zaragoza. The city of Oviedo in Asturias grew about the church dedicated to Vincent. Beyond the Pyrenees, he was venerated first in the vicinity of Béziers, and at Narbonne. Castres became an important stop on the international pilgrimage routes to Santiago de Compostela when the relics of Vincent were transferred to its new abbey-church dedicated to Saint Benedict from Zaragoza in 863, under the patronage of Salomon, count of Cerdanya.

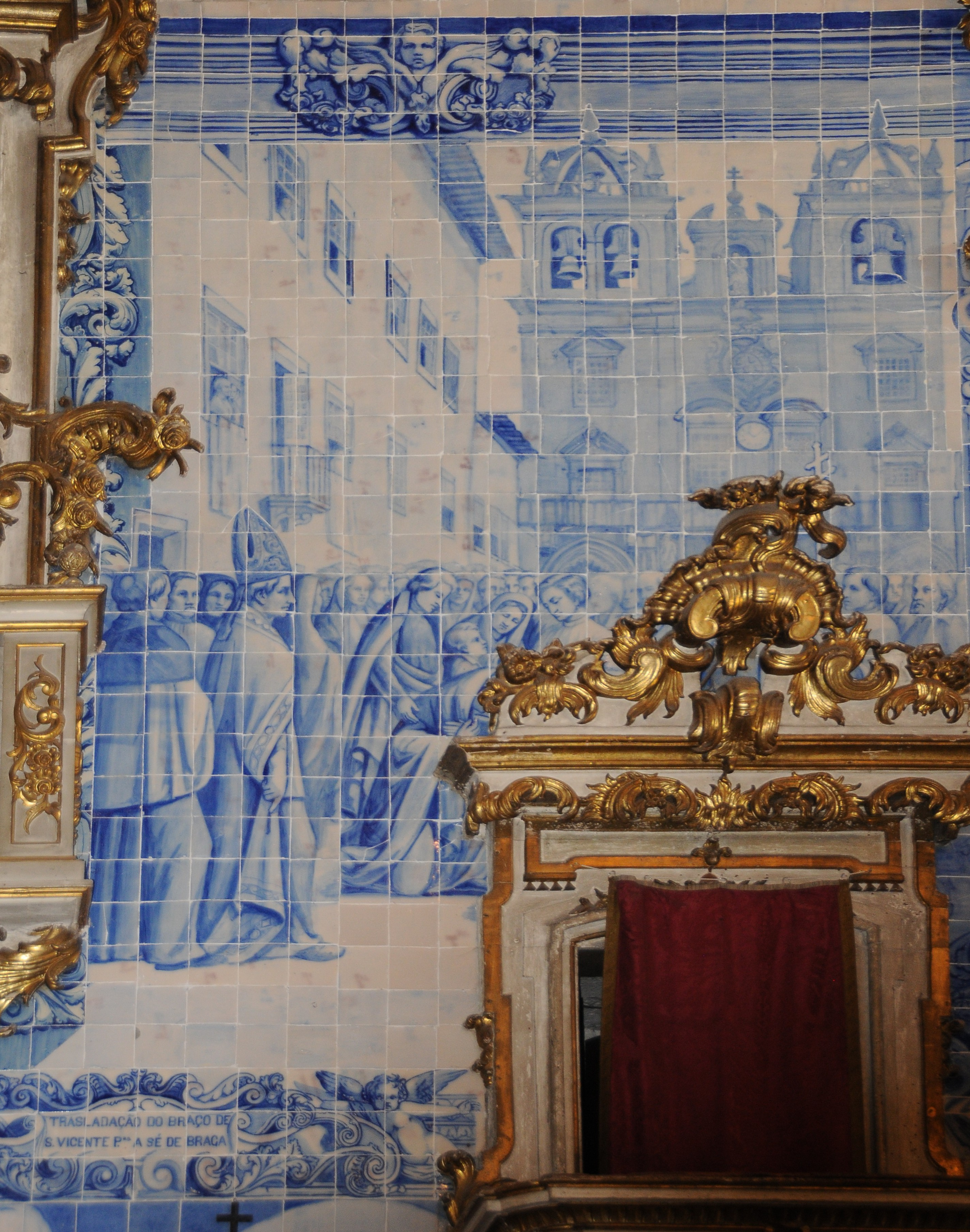
Tiled mosaic in the Cathedral of Braga depicting the translation of St. Vincent's arm

A church was built in honour of Vincent, by the Catholic bishops of Visigothic Iberia, when they succeeded in converting King Reccared and his nobles to Trinitarian Christianity. When the Moors came in 711, the church was razed, and its materials incorporated in the Mezquita de Córdoba, the "Great Mosque" of Cordova.

The Cape Verde island of São Vicente, a former Portuguese colony, was named in his honour because it was discovered on 22 January, Saint Vincent's feast day, in 1462.

The island of Saint Vincent in the Caribbean, now a part of Saint Vincent and the Grenadines, was named by Christopher Columbus after Vincent of Saragossa, as the island was discovered by Europeans on 22 January, Saint Vincent's feast day.

The 15th century Portuguese artist Nuno Gonçalves depicted him in his Saint Vincent Panels. A small fresco cycle of stories of Vincent is in the apse of the Basilica di San Vincenzo near Cantù, in northern Italy.

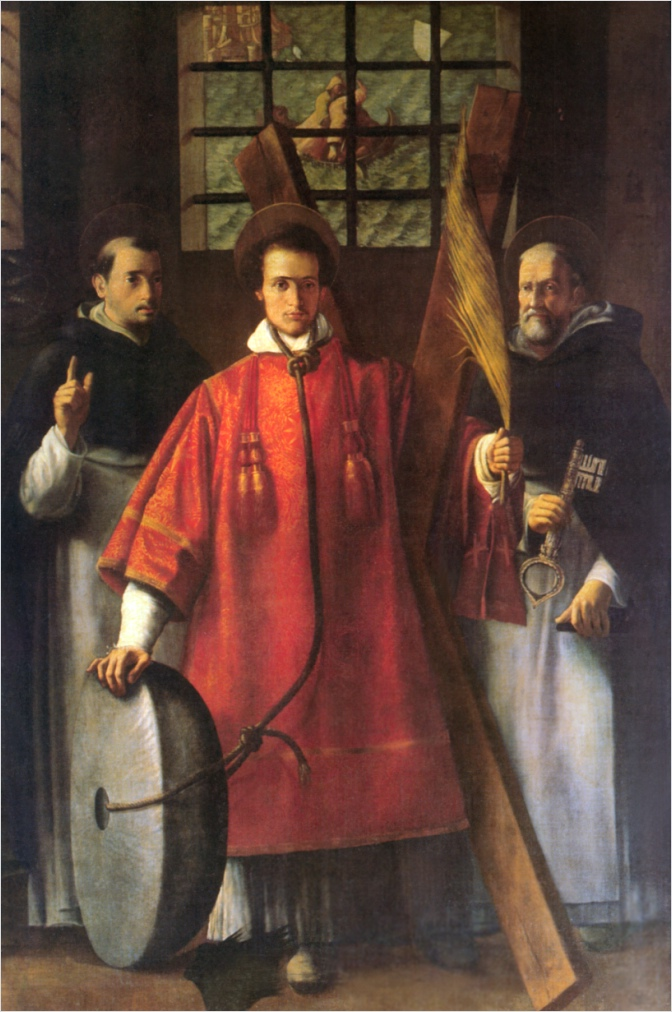
Painting of Saints Vincent Martyr, Vincent Ferrer, and Raymond of Penyafort. Oil on canvas. Anonymous author, school of Francisco Ribalta

Vincent's left arm is on display as a relic in Valencia Cathedral, located near the extensive Carrer de Sant Vicent Mártir (Saint Vincent the Martyr Street).

There is also the small town of São Vicente on the Portuguese island of Madeira, and the city of São Vicente, São Paulo in Brazil named after this saint.

Vincent is remembered in the Anglican Communion with a commemoration on 22 January. The Anglican St. Vincent's Cathedral in Bedford, Texas, is dedicated in his honor.

The young men of Manganeses de la Polvorosa, province of Zamora, Spain, celebrated Vincent's day by dropping a live goat from the belfry of the St. Vincent church.

=== Patronage ===
Saint Vincent is the patron of the Order of the Deacons of the Catholic Diocese of Bergamo. He is honoured as patron in Valencia, Zaragoza, and Portugal, and is invoked by vignerons (wine-makers), vintners (wine-merchants), vinegar-makers, brickmakers, and sailors.

=== Iconography ===
Vincent of Saragossa is portrayed as a deacon; in the Western church, wearing the dalmatic of a deacon.

== See also ==
- Saint Vincent of Saragossa, patron saint archive
