= Primus and Felician =

Catholic saints from Italy (died c. 297)

Saints Primus and Felician
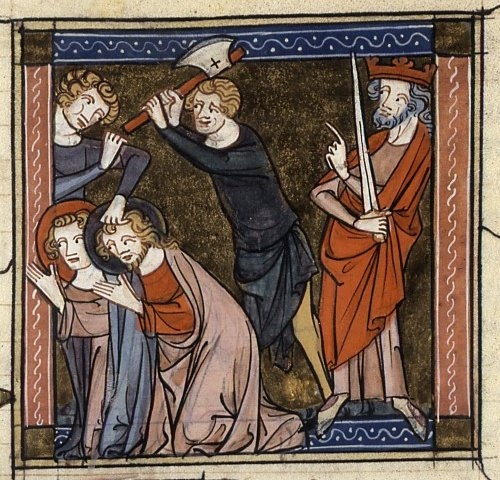
- Saints Primus and Felicianus, from a 14th-century manuscript of the "Golden Legend"

Martyrs
- Born: early 3rd century Nomentum (modern-day Mentana)
- Died: c. 297 AD on the Via Nomentana, Rome
- Venerated in: Catholic Church
- Canonized: Pre-Congregation
- Major shrine: Church of Santo Stefano Rotondo, Rome
- Feast: 9 June
- Attributes: As portrayed at their martyrdom: St Felician is nailed to a tree and St Primus is forced to swallow molten lead.

Saints Primus and Felician (Felicianus) (Italian: Primo e Feliciano) were brothers who suffered martyrdom c. 297 AD during the Diocletian persecution. The Martyrologium Hieronymianum gives under June 9 the names of Primus and Felician who were buried at the fourteenth milestone of the Via Nomentana (near Nomentum, now Mentana near Rome).

They were evidently from Nomentum. This notice comes from the catalogue of Roman martyrs of the fourth century.

== Acts ==
Their "Acts" relate that Sts Felician and Primus were brothers and patricians who had converted to Christianity and devoted themselves to caring for the poor and visiting prisoners.

Arrested, they both refused to sacrifice to the public gods. They were imprisoned and scourged. They were brought separately before the judge Promotus, who tortured them together and endeavored to deceive them that the other had apostatized by offering sacrifice. This had no effect on the brothers, and the two were subsequently beheaded under the Emperor Diocletian at Nomentum (12 miles from Rome). St Primus was eighty years old at the time of his death. A church was built over their tombs on the Via Nomentana.

== Burial ==
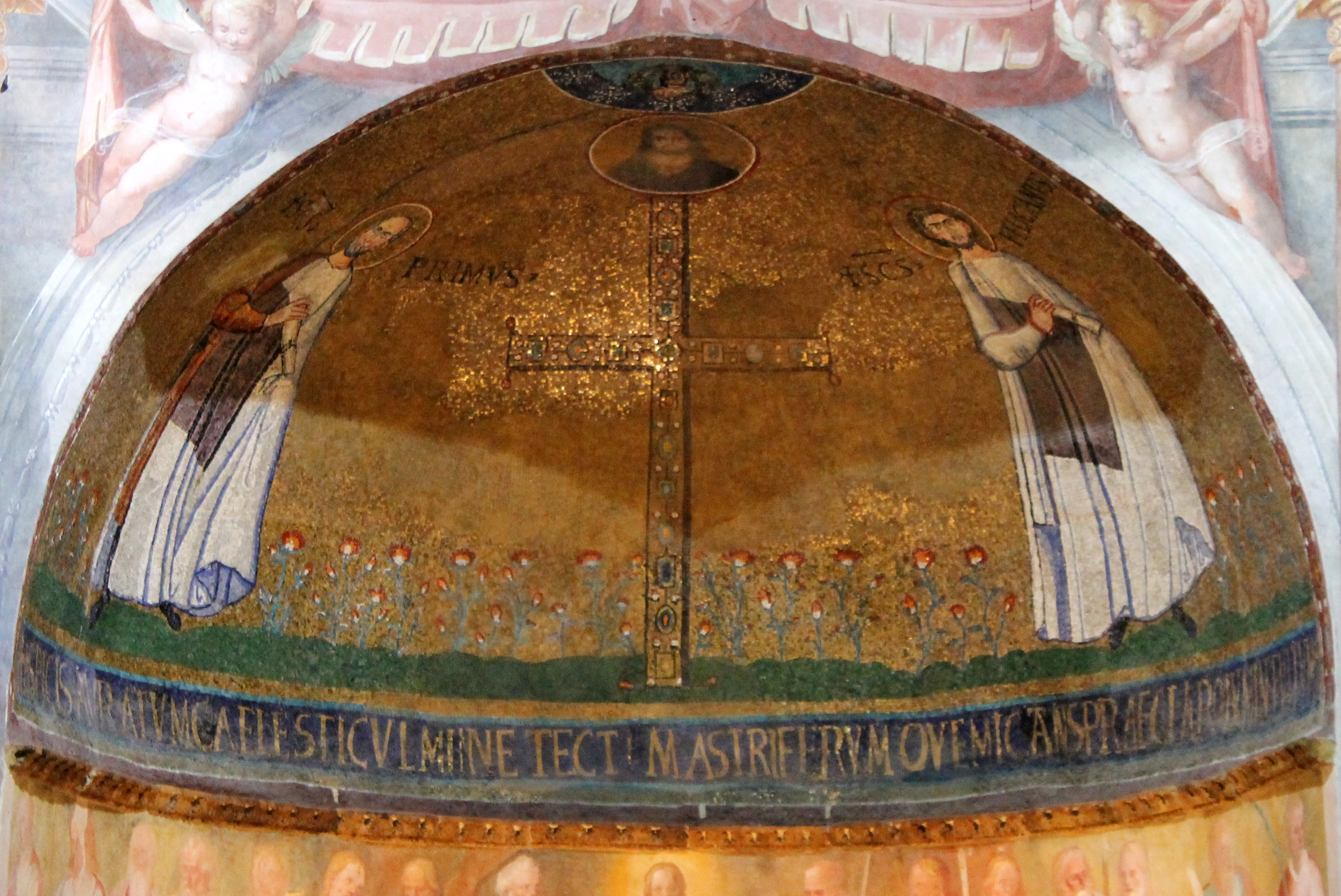
Ss Primo e Feliciano S Stefano Rotondo, Roma

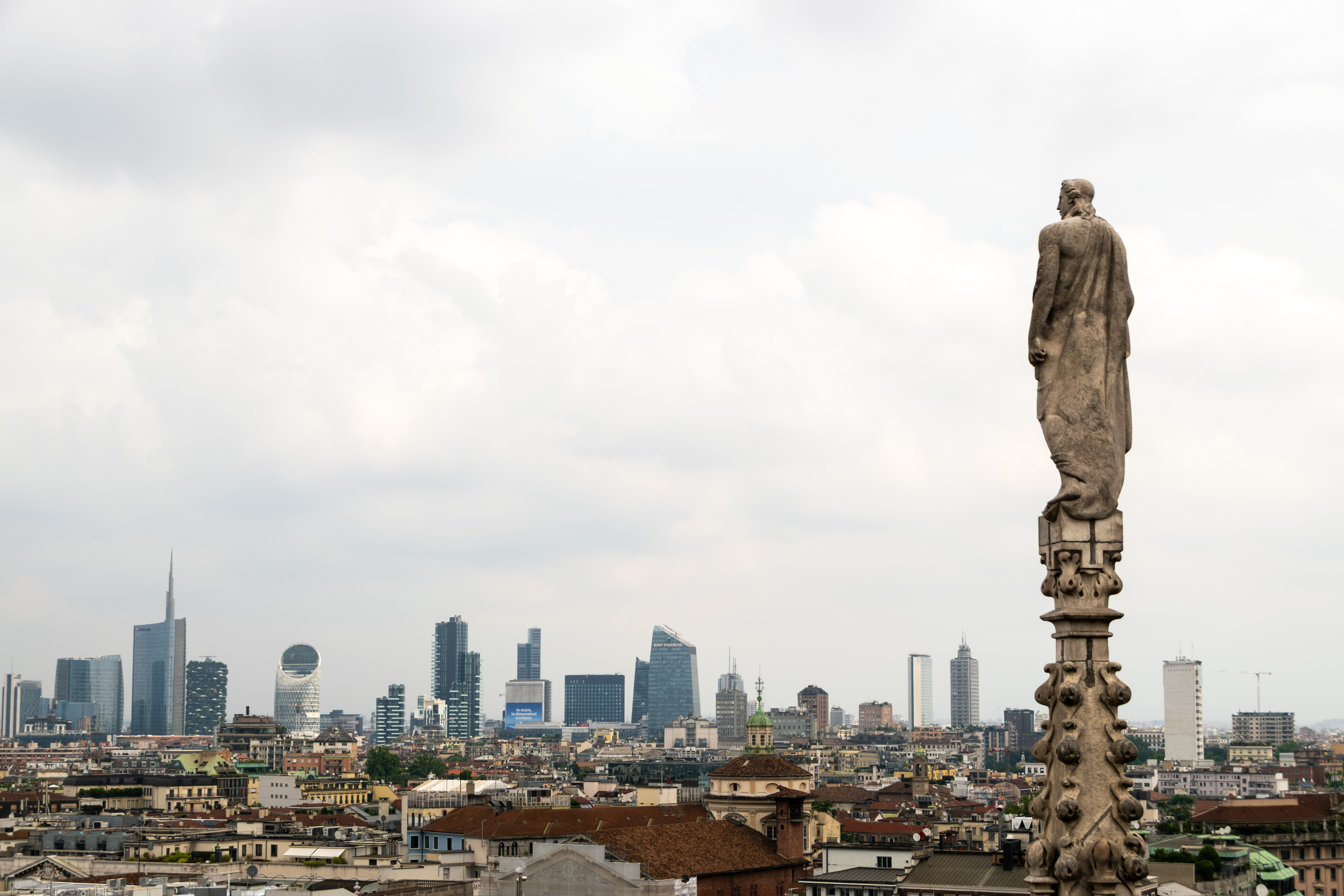
Statue of St. Primus, Milan Cathedral, overlooking Milan's Zone 9

They appear to be the first martyrs of whom it is recorded that their bodies were subsequently reburied within the walls of Rome. In 648 Pope Theodore I translated the bones of the two saints (together with the remains of his father) to the Church of Santo Stefano Rotondo, under an altar erected in their honor where they remain. The Chapel of Ss. Primo e Feliciano contains mosaics from the 7th century. The chapel was built by Pope Theodore I. One mosaic shows the martyrs St Primus and St Felician flanking a crux gemmata (jeweled cross).

Other depictions of the saints can be found at Venice, in the St Mark's Basilica (13th century) and at Palermo, Sicily, in the Cappella Palatina (12th century).

== Veneration ==
Their feast day is 9 June. In the past they were also included in the General Roman Calendar, but because of the limited worldwide interest in them, it was decided in 1969 to leave to individual dioceses the decision whether to include them in their local calendars.

=== Veneration in Bavaria ===
A Bavarian tradition holds that Sts Primus and Felician were Roman legionaries who became missionaries in the region of Chiemgau, where Primus found in a forest a fountain with curative properties. The two brothers preached the Gospel there and cured the sick by virtue of their prayers and the virtue of the source. When they returned to Italy, they were martyred under Diocletian. The fountain, known as the Fountain of Saint Primus, can still be seen at Adelholzen, an area of hot springs where a chapel constructed in 1615 can be found, dedicated to these saints, who are much venerated in the area.

=== Veneration at Agen ===
During the 9th century, the cult of Saint Faith was fused with that of Caprasius of Agen (Caprais) and Alberta of Agen, also associated with Agen. Caprasius' cult in turn was fused with that of Primus and Felician, who are called Caprasius' brothers.

One legend states that during the persecutions of Christians by the prefect Dacian, Caprasius fled to Mont-Saint-Vincent, near Agen. He witnessed the execution of Faith from atop the hill. Caprasius was condemned to death, and was joined on his way to execution by Alberta, Faith's sister (also identified as Caprasius' mother), and two brothers, named Primus and Felician. All four were beheaded.
