= Dacian (prefect) =

4th-century Roman administrator of Gaul

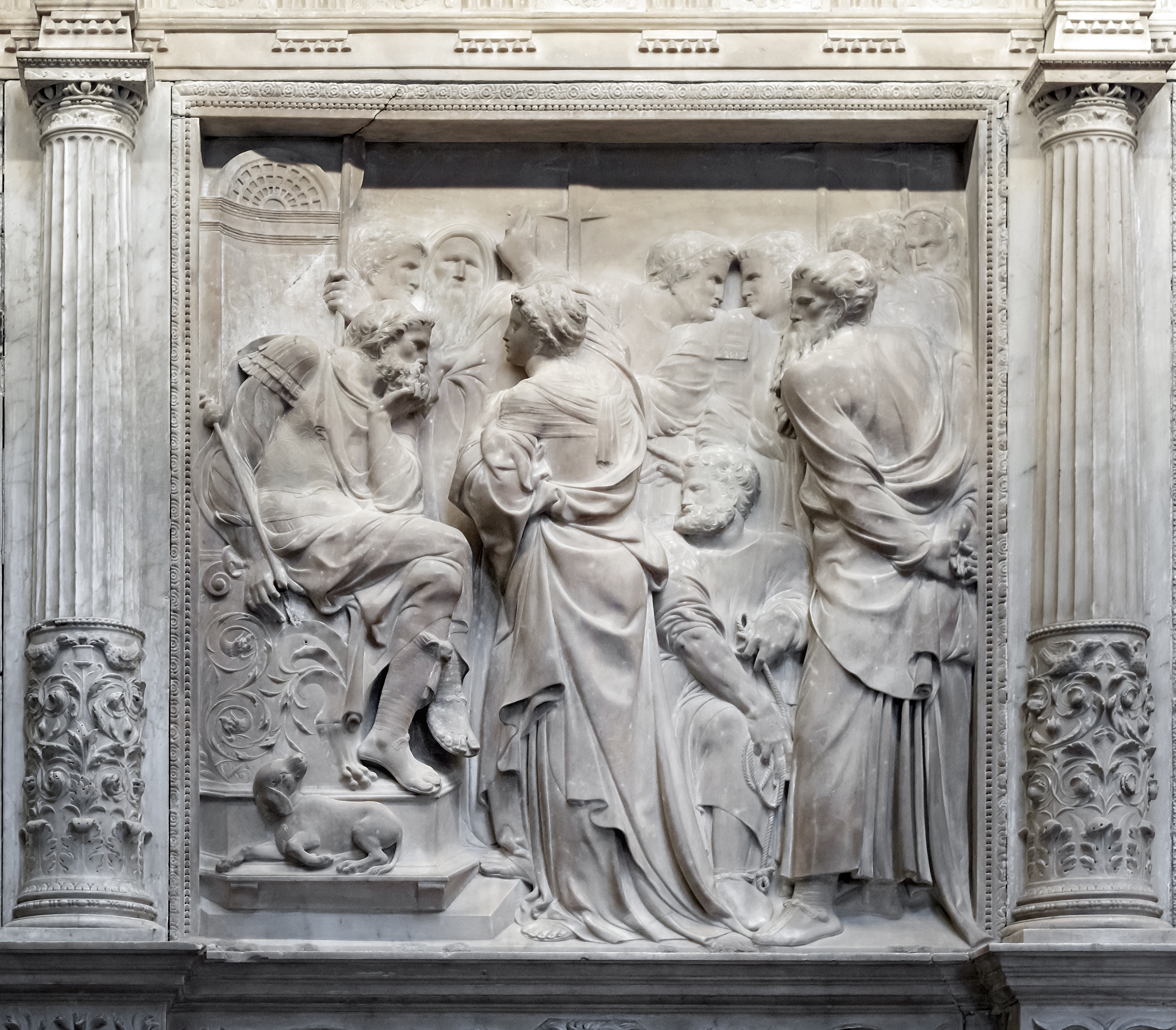
Judgment of Eulalia of Barcelona by Dacian - Bartolomé Ordóñez (1519), Barcelona Cathedral Interior.

Under the Roman emperors Diocletian and Maximian, Dacian or Dacianus had been prefect of Gaul, and had also acted in Hispania Tarraconensis or Hispania Carthaginensis. Martyred under him, amongst others, were Caprasius of Agen, Eulalia of Barcelona, Saint Faith and Vincent of Saragossa.
