= Caprasius of Agen =

French Christian martyr and saint

Saint Caprasius of Agen
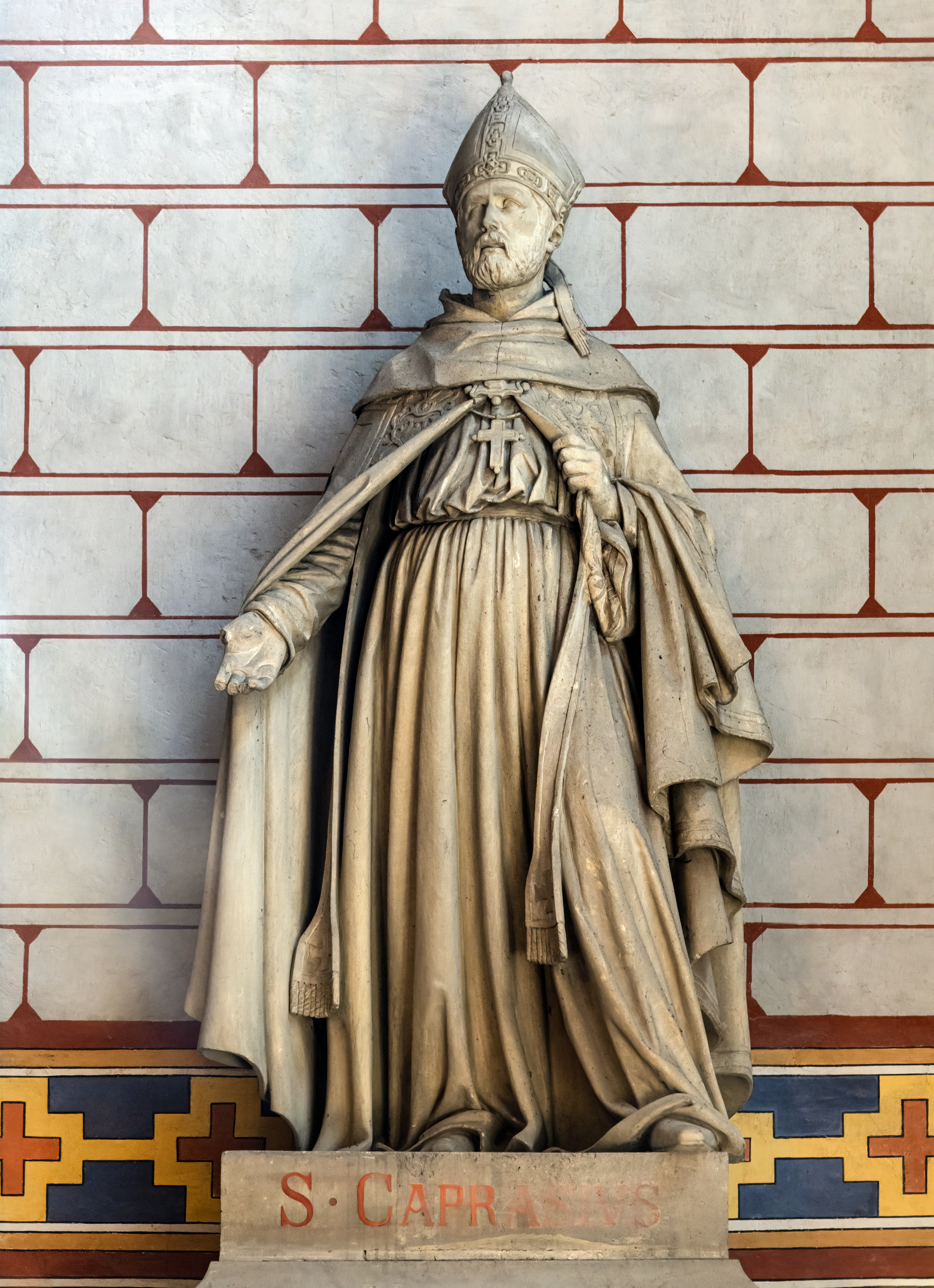
- Statue of Caprasius of Agen, in the cathedral of Agen.
- Died: 303 AD; Agen
- Venerated in: Roman Catholic Church; Eastern Orthodox Church
- Feast: October 20

Saint Caprasius of Agen (French: Saint Caprais) is venerated as a Christian martyr and saint of the fourth century. Relics associated with him were discovered at Agen in south-west France in the fifth century. Local legends dating from the 14th century make him the first bishop of Agen, though, as Alban Butler writes, the only evidence to support his existence is the dedication of a church to him in the 6th century.

During the 9th century, his cult was fused with that of Saint Faith and Alberta of Agen, also associated with Agen. His cult was also fused with that of Primus and Felician, who are called Caprasius' brothers.

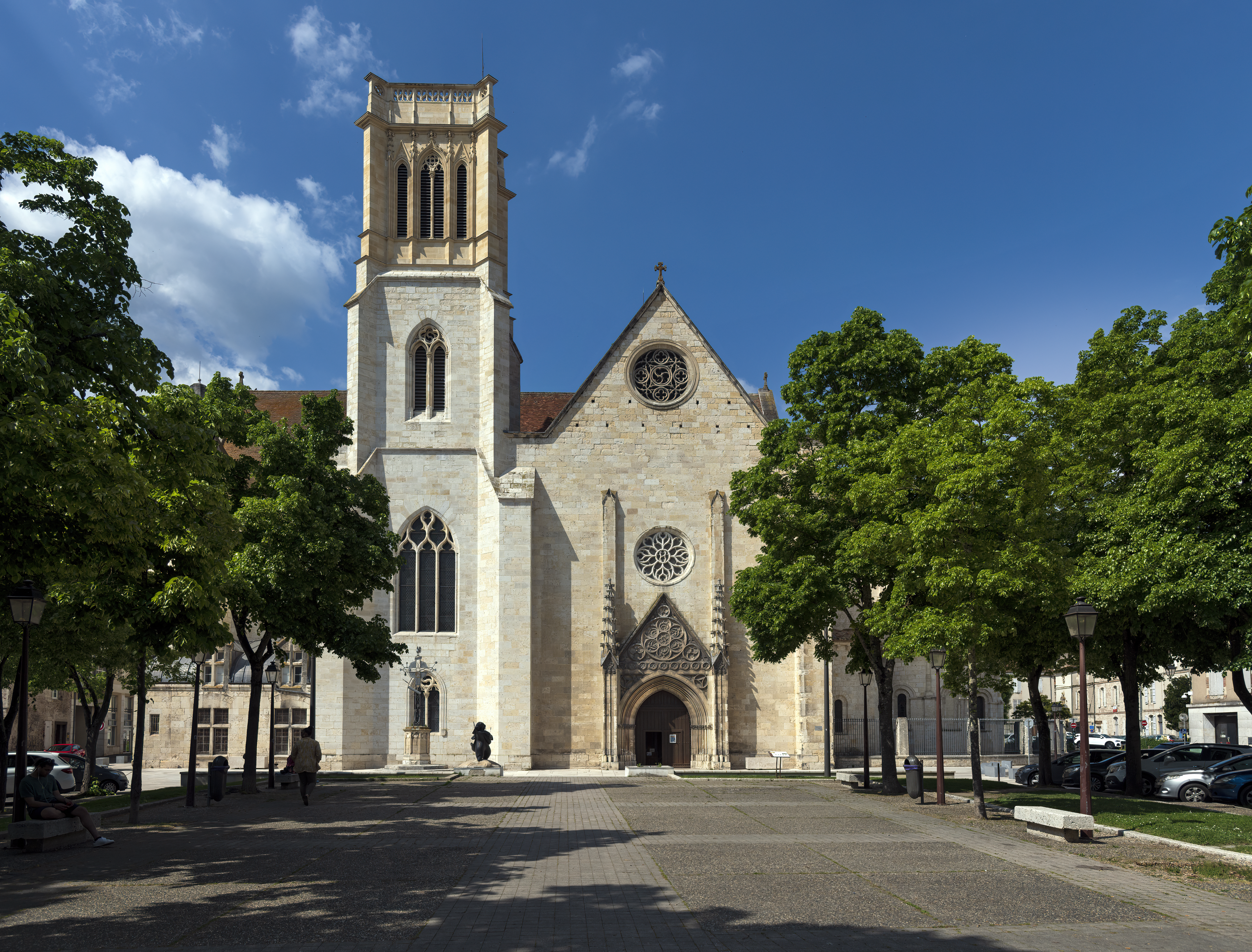
Cathédrale Saint-Caprais d'Agen

In the year 866, Faith's remains had been transferred to Conques, which was along the pilgrimage route to Compostela. Her cult, centered at the Abbatiale Sainte-Foy de Conques, spread along the pilgrim routes on the Way of St. James. The Church of San Caprasio, built in the beginning of the 11th century, is a First Romanesque church located at Santa Cruz de la Serós, which was on the Way of St. James.

== Legend ==
During the persecutions of Christians by the prefect Dacian, Caprasius fled to Mont-Saint-Vincent, near Agen. He witnessed the execution of Faith from atop the hill. Caprasius was condemned to death, and was joined on his way to execution by Alberta, Faith's sister (also identified as Caprasius' mother), and two brothers, named Primus and Felician. All four were beheaded.

== Dedications ==
- San Caprasio, a church in Santa Cruz de la Serós, Jacetania, Spain
- San Caprasio, a church in Suellacabras, province of Soria, autonomous community of Castile and León, Spain
