= Suellacabras =

- Municipality
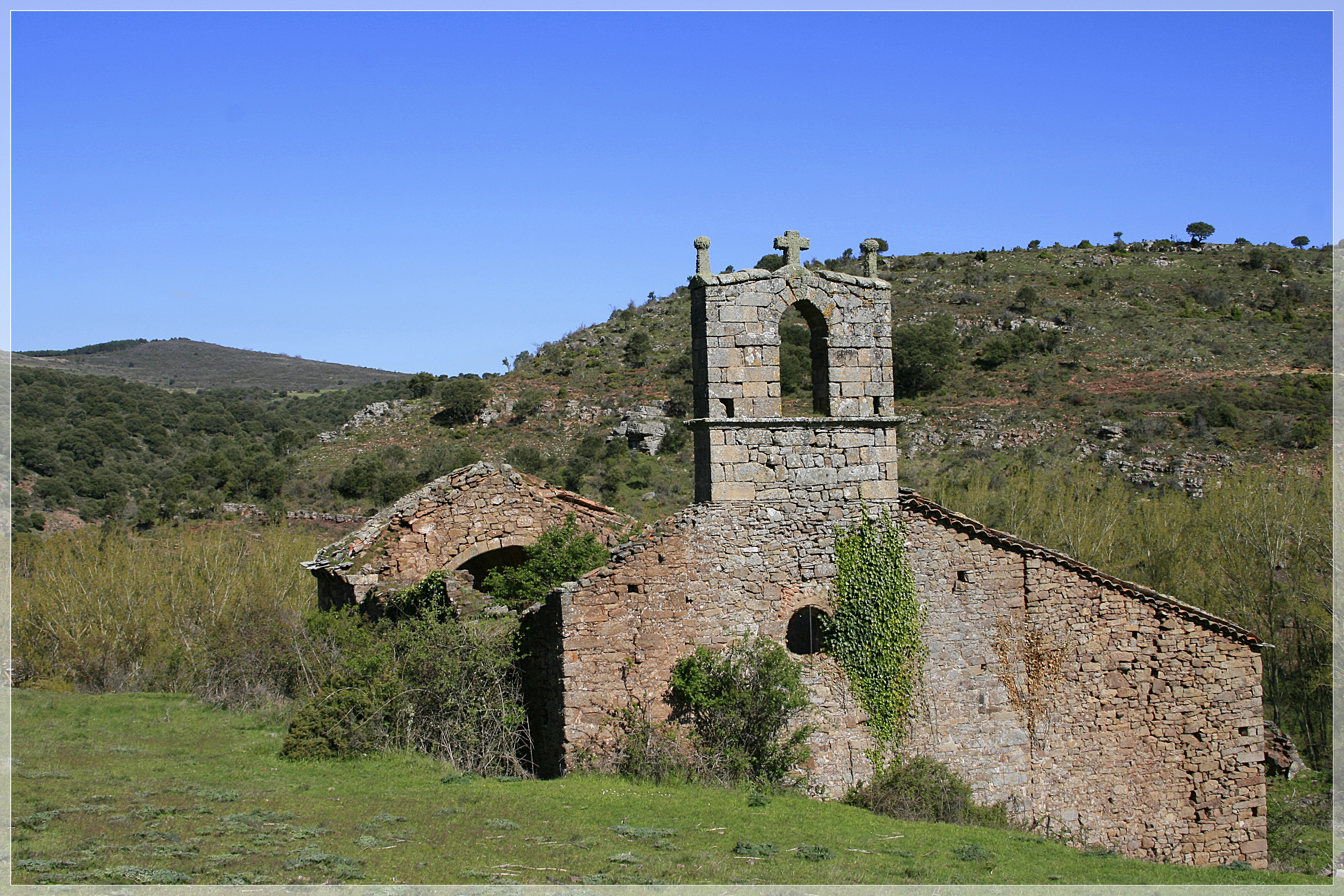
- Ermita de San Craprasio, Suellacabras.

- Location in Spain. Suellacabras (Spain)
- Coordinates: 41°51′09″N 2°13′24″W
- Country: Spain
- Autonomous community: Castile and León
- Province: Soria
- Municipality: Suellacabras

Government
  - Mayor: María Felicidad Gómez Lafuente

Area
  - Total: 39.19 km^{2} (15.13 sq mi)
- Elevation: 1,196 m (3,924 ft)

Population (2023)
  - Total: 31
  - Density: 0.79/km^{2} (2.0/sq mi)
- Time zone: UTC+1 (CET)
  - Summer (DST): UTC+2 (CEST)
- Website: Official website

Suellacabras is a small Spanish town and municipality, located in the province of Soria, part of the autonomous community of Castile and León.

It is located in the mountain range known as Sierra del Almuerzo.

The most important attraction is the church of San Caprasio.

In the municipality is included the village El Espino, with the romanesque church of San Benito and two hermitages: Virgen del Espinar and San Román (gothic, ruins).
