= El Espino, Spain =

Human settlement in Suellacabras, Soria Province, Castile and León, Spain

Coordinates: 42.5667°N 3°W

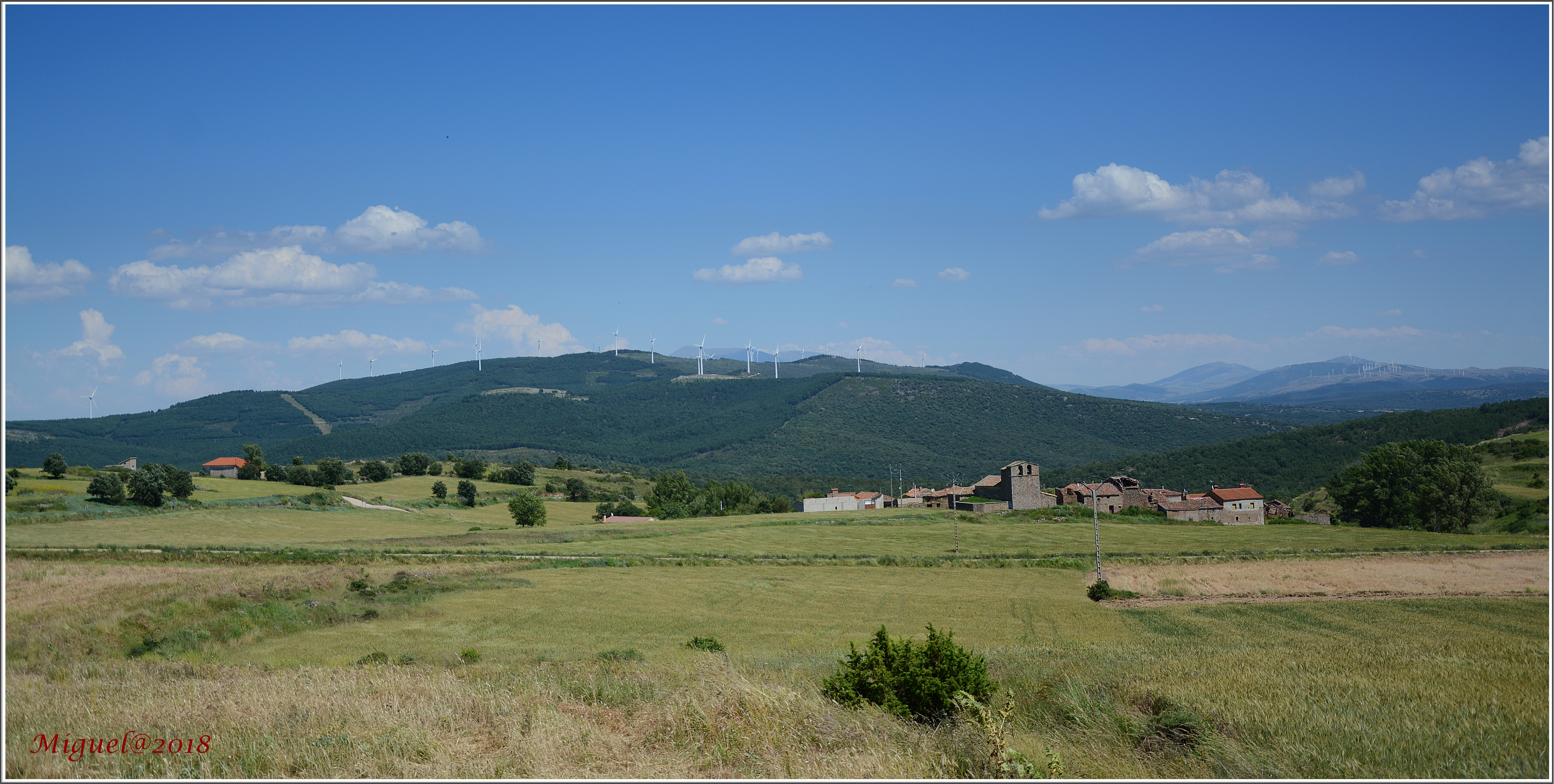
El Espino, Soria

El Espino is a small village which is included in the municipality of Suellacabras, Soria province, autonomous community of Castilla y León, Spain. The village is located at a height of 1264 m, near the Almuerzo range. The climate is continental, very cold in winter and hot in summer. El Espino is located in a region called "Las Tierras Altas" (The high lands). Some of the peaks which are in the surroundings are Matute (1429 m) or Almuerzo (1556 m).

According to the 2006 census, the village has a population of 5 inhabitants, as a result from the rural exodus process, which began in the 60s and led to most of the population to move to other provinces like Zaragoza, Navarra, Vizcaya, Barcelona or to the province capital Soria.

The main attractive of the village is the little romanesque church (12th and 13th centuries) of San Benito, restored in the beginning of the 21st century. It has also two hermitages: Virgen del Espinar and San Román (ruins).

There are also remains of a celtiberic "castro" (village) in "Los Castillejos" spot, dated on the 6th century b.C.

The typical crops cultivated in this area are wheat, barley and rye, with a low productivity. The village used to be a livestock area, with flocks of sheep and goats.
A windmill installation has been placed in the surrounding mountains in the year 2003.
