= Goat throwing =

Former Spanish festivity

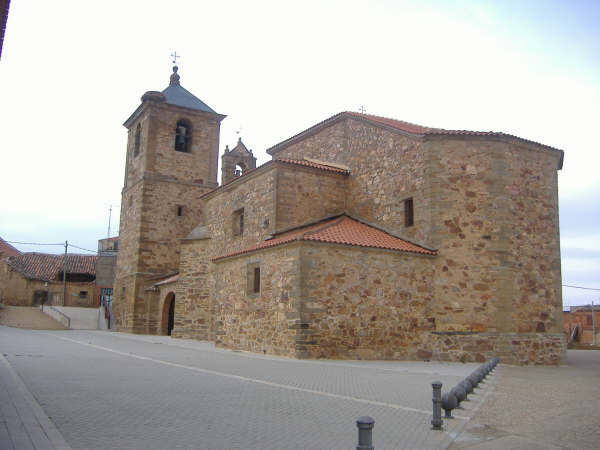
Church of Manganeses de la Polvorosa, dedicated to Vincent of Saragossa

Goat throwing (in Spanish: Lanzamiento de cabra desde campanario or Salto de la cabra) was a festival celebrated in the town of Manganeses de la Polvorosa, province of Zamora, Spain, on the fourth Sunday of January. The festival coincided with the commemoration of Saint Vincent the Martyr.

== Background ==
It is unclear when the tradition of throwing a goat from the belfry of the Church of Saint Vincent Martyr in the town of Manganeses de la Polvorosa began. The festival coincided with the commemoration of Saint Vincent's saint's day. Each year, local residents threw a live goat from the top of the church. Below, a crowd would then catch the falling goat with a canvas sheet. Some goats survived the fall and some did not. If the goat survived it was revered and paraded through the small village, becoming a local legend for years to come. The event was organized by young men, who had just turned 18, and were now eligible for military service.

The event is inspired by a legend that states that a priest's goat, whose milk fed the poor, fell out of the tower, but landed safely. Another story says that the goat made its way up the belfry to eat the food left for the doves, it lost its footing and fell, and the goat landed on its hooves and disappeared into the woods.

== Animal rights ==
Spain has a number of festivals that involve some sort of animal cruelty. Among them are burning the bull, donkey baiting, shaving of the beasts (Galicia), garrotting the galgos, quail catapulting, Day of the Geese, running of the bulls, and bull fighting.

Over the years, animal rights groups demanded an end to the practice of throwing the goat. In 1992, the local governor banned the toss. The villagers used ropes to lower the goat, but in 1993 they went back to dropping the goat from the church. Once again, the practice was banned in 2000. A toy plush goat was thrown in the 2014 celebration.

== See also ==
- Animal rights
- Cruelty to animals
- Pain in animals
