= Alberta of Agen =

3rd-century Roman martyr and saint

Saint Alberta of Agen
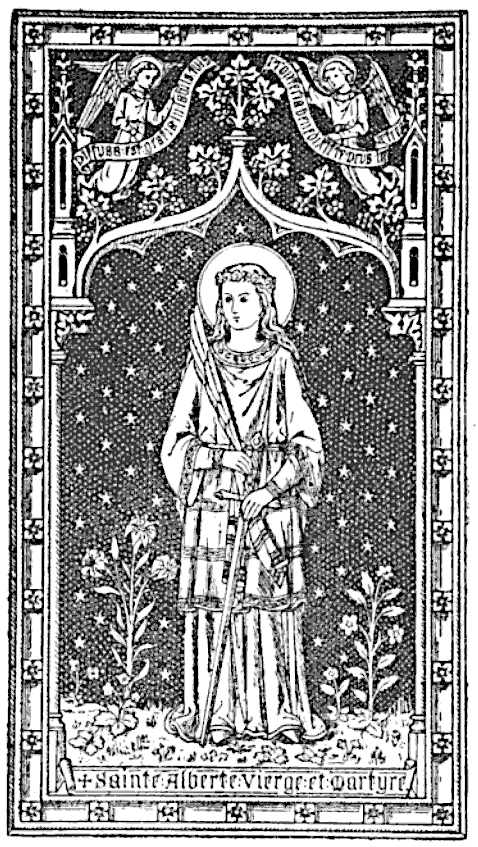
- Died: 286 AD; Agen
- Venerated in: Roman Catholic Church
- Feast: March 11

Saint Alberta of Agen (died ca. 286) was a Roman venerated as a martyr and saint. Supposed to have been one of the first victims of Diocletian's persecutions, she was tortured with Saint Faith and Saint Caprasius in Agen, France. According to tradition, some spectators objected to this, and were subsequently beheaded as well. Alberta is commemorated on March 11.
