= Saint Faith =

Gallo-Roman saint

Saint Faith of Conques
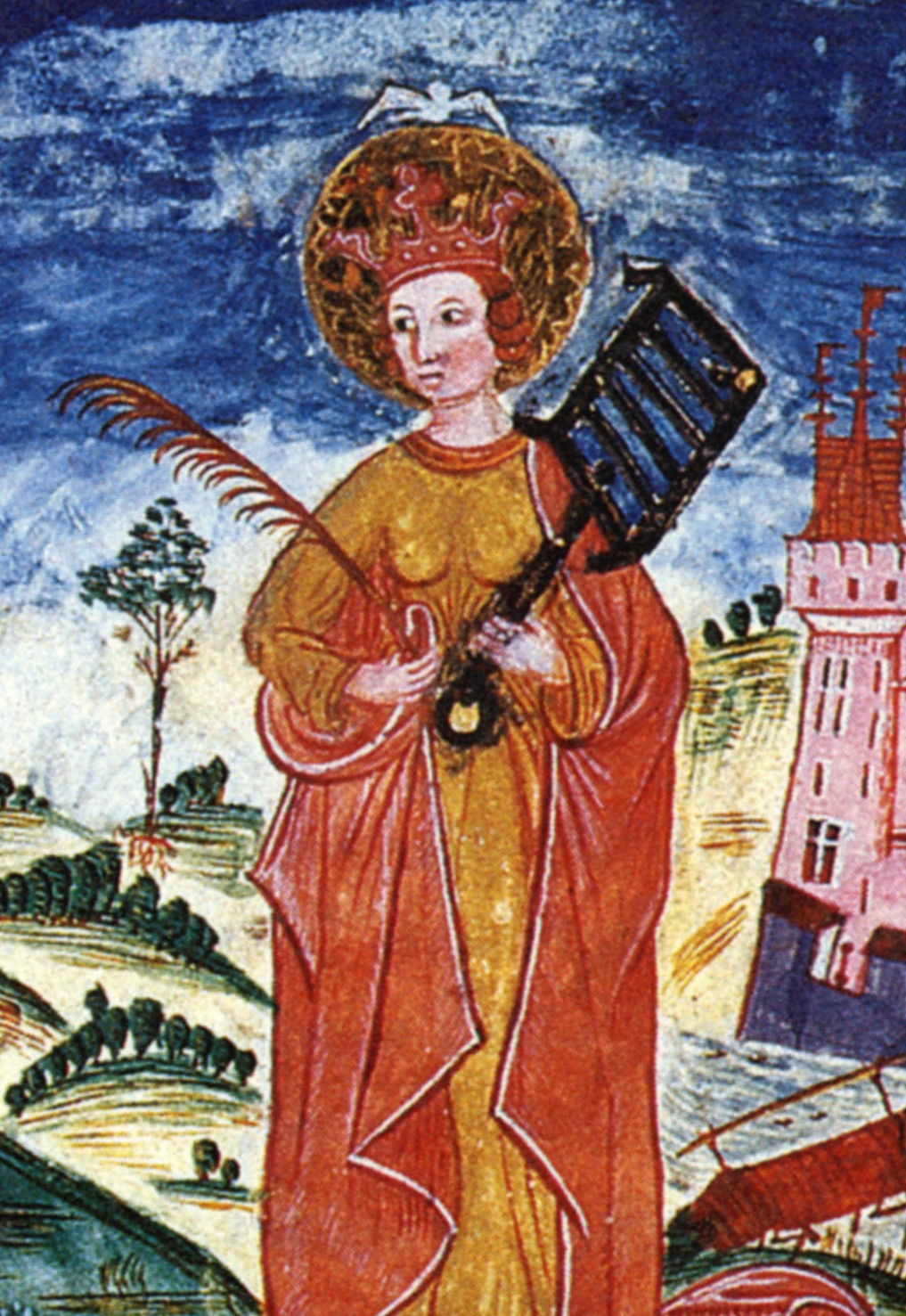
- Depiction of St Faith with her attributes, gridiron, crown and the martyr's palm

Virgin martyr
- Born: 3rd century Agen, Gallia Narbonensis, Western Roman Empire
- Died: c. 3rd–4th century Gallia Narbonensis
- Venerated in: Eastern Orthodox Church; Roman Catholic Church; Anglican Communion
- Canonized: Pre-Congregation
- Major shrine: Conques, Occitanie, France
- Feast: 6 October
- Attributes: Gridiron; rods; sword
- Patronage: Pilgrims; prisoners; soldiers

Saint Faith, Saint Faith of Conques or Saint Faith of Agen (Latin: Sancta Fides; French: Sainte Foy; Spanish: Santa Fe) is a saint who is said to have been a girl or young woman of Agen in Aquitaine. Her legend recounts how she was arrested during persecution of Christians by the Roman Empire and refused to make pagan sacrifices. Saint Faith was tortured to death with a red-hot brazier. Her death is sometimes said to have occurred in the year 287 or 290, sometimes in the large-scale Diocletianic Persecution beginning in 303. She is listed as "Sancta Fides, Virgin and martyr", in the martyrologies.

The center of her cult was transferred to the Abbey of Sainte-Foy, Conques, where her relics arrived in the ninth century, stolen from Agen by a monk from the Abbey nearby at Conques.

== Legend ==
A number of legends exist regarding Faith, and she was confused with the three legendary sisters known as Faith, Hope, and Charity. She is recorded in the Martyrologium Hieronymianum under October 6, but the date of her death is not given. A Passio, now lost, once existed, and appears in summarized form in the ninth-century martyrology of Florus of Lyon. Her legends portray her as a patron who could turn against those who only gave small donations to her church at Conques.

It is believed that Saint Faith, a young girl from Agen, was martyred at the end of third or beginning of the fourth century, in which she was tortured naked over a brazier. The first extant reference to the martyrdom of Faith exists in the late sixth-century manuscript copy of the martyrology of Jerome, who died in 420, in which her feast day is listed as 6 October. Faith's martyrdom was later recounted in the Passio in the mid-ninth-century.

== Accounts ==
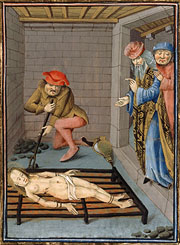
Medieval depiction of Faith's martyrdom.

Her popular hagiography, Liber miraculorum sancte Fidis, attributed to the churchman Bernard of Angers (composed between ca 1013 and after 1020), calls miracles associated with Faith joca—Latin for "tricks" or "jokes", the kind that "the inhabitants of the place call Sainte Foy's jokes, which is the way peasants understand such things." One such joke was the following story: a local castellan holds onto a ring that his dying wife had promised to the saint. The castellan, whose name is Austrin, uses the ring, however, to wed his second wife. Saint Faith causes the finger of the second wife to swell up in unbearable pain. Austrin and his new wife visit the saint's shrine, and on the third night, "when the sorrowful woman happened to blow her nose, the ring flew off without hurting her fingers, just as if it had been hurled from the strongest siege engine, and gave a sharp crack on the pavement at a great distance." She was also known to restore the eyes and eyesight of those who lost them while being faithful to her, often retracting their eyesight when they became arrogant.

The Cançó de Santa Fe, celebrating Saint Faith in 593 octosyllabic lines, is the earliest known written work in the Catalan language, set down during the reign of Ramon Berenguer I, Count of Barcelona, between 1054 and 1076 (often dated c. 1070). It was primarily based on a now lost Latin Passio sanctorum Fidis et Caprisii.

Saint Faith's life and martyrdom has been recounted in several other verse narratives and martyrologies. A French verse narrative of Saint Faith, La Vie de Sainte Foy, was written by Simon of Walsingham, a monk at the Bury St Edmunds Abbey based on Latin sources.

== Veneration ==
During the 12th century, Faith's cult (i.e., devotion and religious practices associated with her) was fused with that of Caprasius of Agen (Caprais) and Alberta of Agen, both associated with Agen. Caprasius' cult in turn was also fused with that of Primus and Felician, who are called Caprasius' brothers. Simon of Walsingham's 12th-century verse narrative of Saint Faith's life, La Vie de Sainte Foy, Dacian, Caprais, and Primus and Felician figure heavily.

One legend, retold in La Vie de Sainte Foy by Simon of Walsingham in the 12th century, states that during the persecutions of Christians by the prefect Dacian, Caprasius fled to Mont-Saint-Vincent, near Agen. He witnessed the execution of Faith from atop the hill. Caprasius was condemned to death, and was joined on his way to execution by Alberta, Faith's sister (also identified as Caprasius' mother), and two brothers, named Primus and Felician. All four were beheaded.

== Cult and reliquary ==
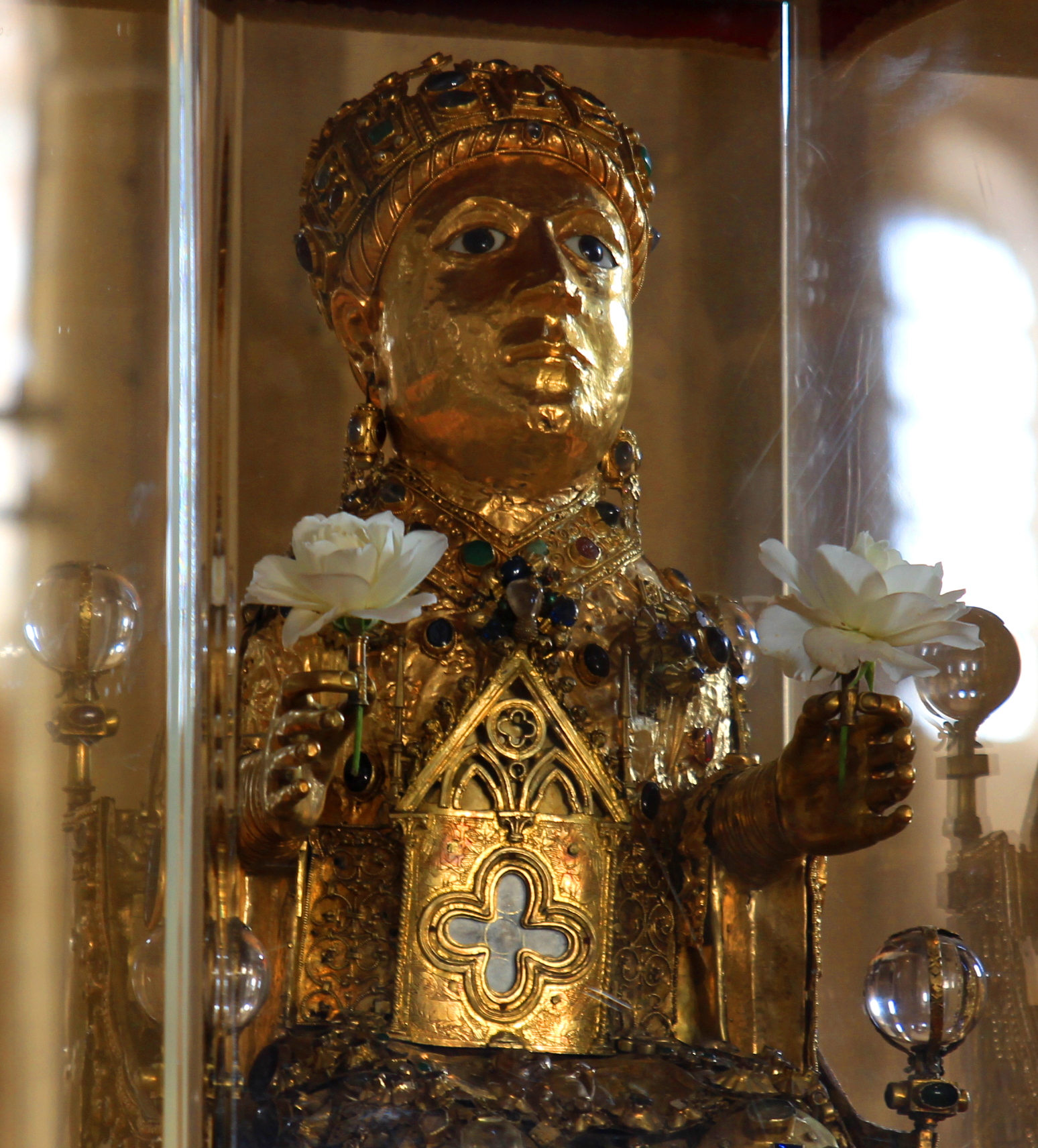
Ninth-century reliquary of Saint Faith at Conques.

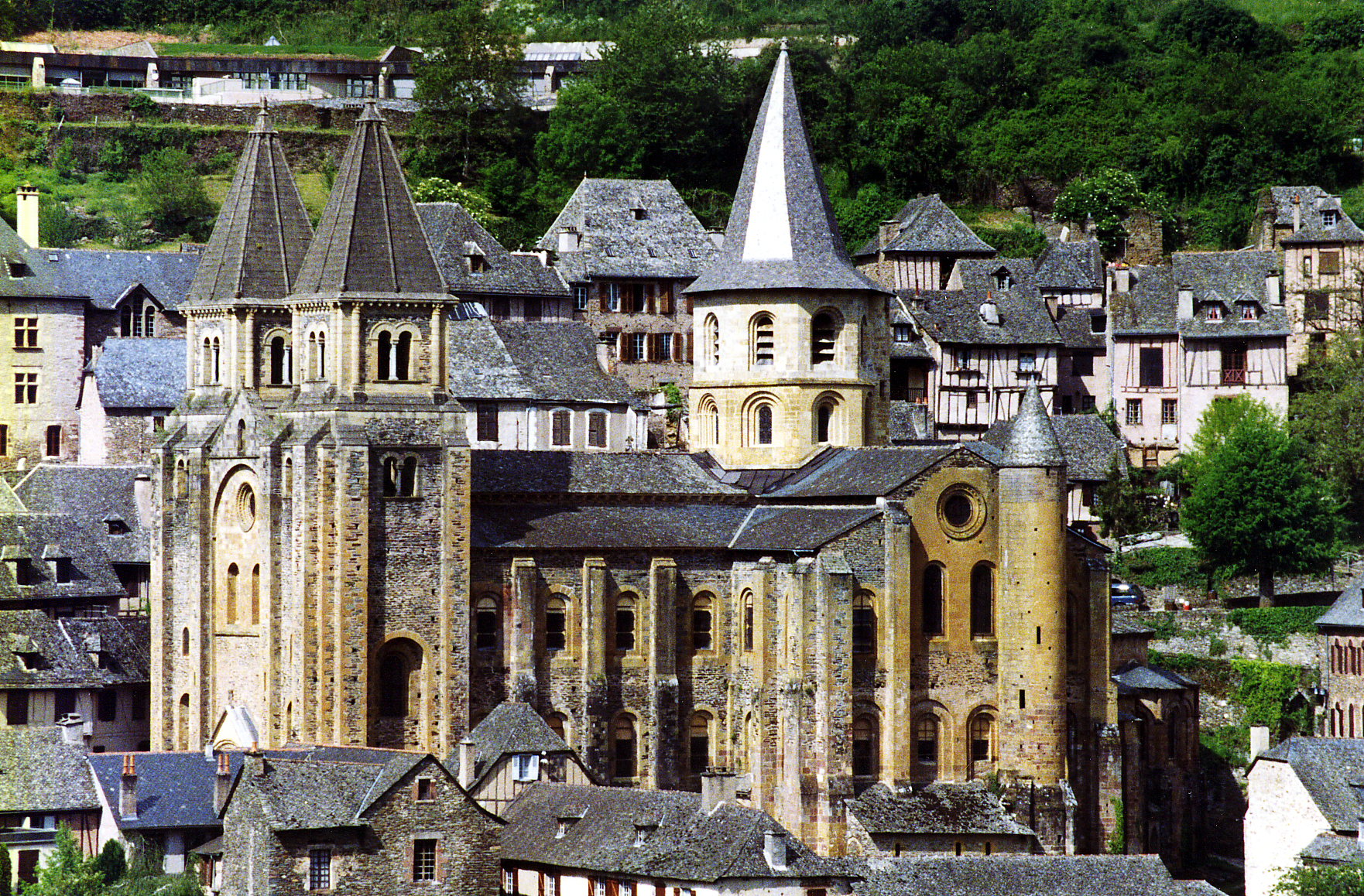
Abbey of Sainte-Foy, Conques.

In the fifth century, Dulcitius, bishop of Agen, ordered the construction of a basilica dedicated to her, later restored in the 8th century and enlarged in the 15th. It was demolished in 1892 due to an urban planning effort at Agen.

The center of her cult was not the basilica but the abbatial church of Saint Foy at Conques. In 866, her remains had been transferred to Conques, which was along the pilgrimage route to Compostela. Her cult, centered at the Abbatiale Sainte-Foy de Conques, spread along the pilgrim routes on the Way of St. James—and beyond, for her cult became popular in England, Italy, and South America. In c. 1105, a priory dedicated to Saint Faith was erected in Horsham, a village in Norfolk, by Robert and Sybil Fitzwalter, in which murals of Saint Faith have survived, discovered in 1969 hidden behind a refectory wall.

The gilded reliquary at Conques was described in Bernard of Angers's Book of Miracles of Sainte Foi, about 1010. Bernard of Anger's Book of Miracles of Sainte Foy provides an insightful testimony of his reaction towards Sainte Foy as a medieval cleric and his ambivalent attitude towards reliquaries in general. His change in attitude came when he witnessed an "economically charged [miracle]" in which another cleric, Odalric, claimed he was beaten by Sainte Foy. Thus, Bernard of Angers believed that Sainte Foy punishes non-believers, and, despite previously attacking the statue, he justified his newfound devotion by stating that the idol was a "vehicle to the saint and not the saint herself." It has since been repeatedly adapted and enriched, into the nineteenth century. The head itself, made of a different gold from the body—which is fashioned of thin plates over a yew wood—has been tentatively identified as an imperial portrait of the Later Roman Empire. Thomas Hoving, former director of the Metropolitan Museum of Art, has alternately theorized that the life-size golden face is a portrait or death mask of Charlemagne.

Part of her relics were moved to the monastery of Sant Cugat in Catalonia in 1365. However, the reliquary can be seen in the Abbey at Conques, in France. Important churches were also dedicated to her at Conches-en-Ouche in Normandy and at Sélestat, in Alsace (see St. Faith's Church, Sélestat).

== Notes and references ==
=== References ===
- Ashley, Kathleen M.; Sheingorn, Pamela (1999). Writing Faith: Text, Sign & History in the Miracles of Sainte Foy. University of Chicago Press. ISBN 978-0-226-02966-5.
- Butler, Alban; Farmer, David Hugh; Burns, Paul (2000). Butler's Lives of the Saints. Vol. 4. Liturgical Press. ISBN 978-0-814-62380-0.
- Geary, Patrick (2011) [1975]. Furta Sacra: Thefts of Relics in the Central Middle Ages. Princeton University Press. ISBN 978-1-400-82020-7.
- Hallam, Elizabeth, ed. (1994). Saints: Who They Are and How They Help You. New York: Simon & Schuster. ISBN 978-0-671-88253-2.
- Mornin, Edward; Mornin, Lorna (2009). Saints of California: A Guide to Places and Their Patrons. J. Paul Getty Museum. ISBN 978-0-892-36984-3.
- Russell, Delbert W. (2012). Verse Saints' Lives Written in the French of England. The French of England Translation Series. Vol. 43. Arizona Center for Medieval and Renaissance Studies. ISBN 978-0-866-98479-9.
