= Studenten =

Swedish graduation celebration

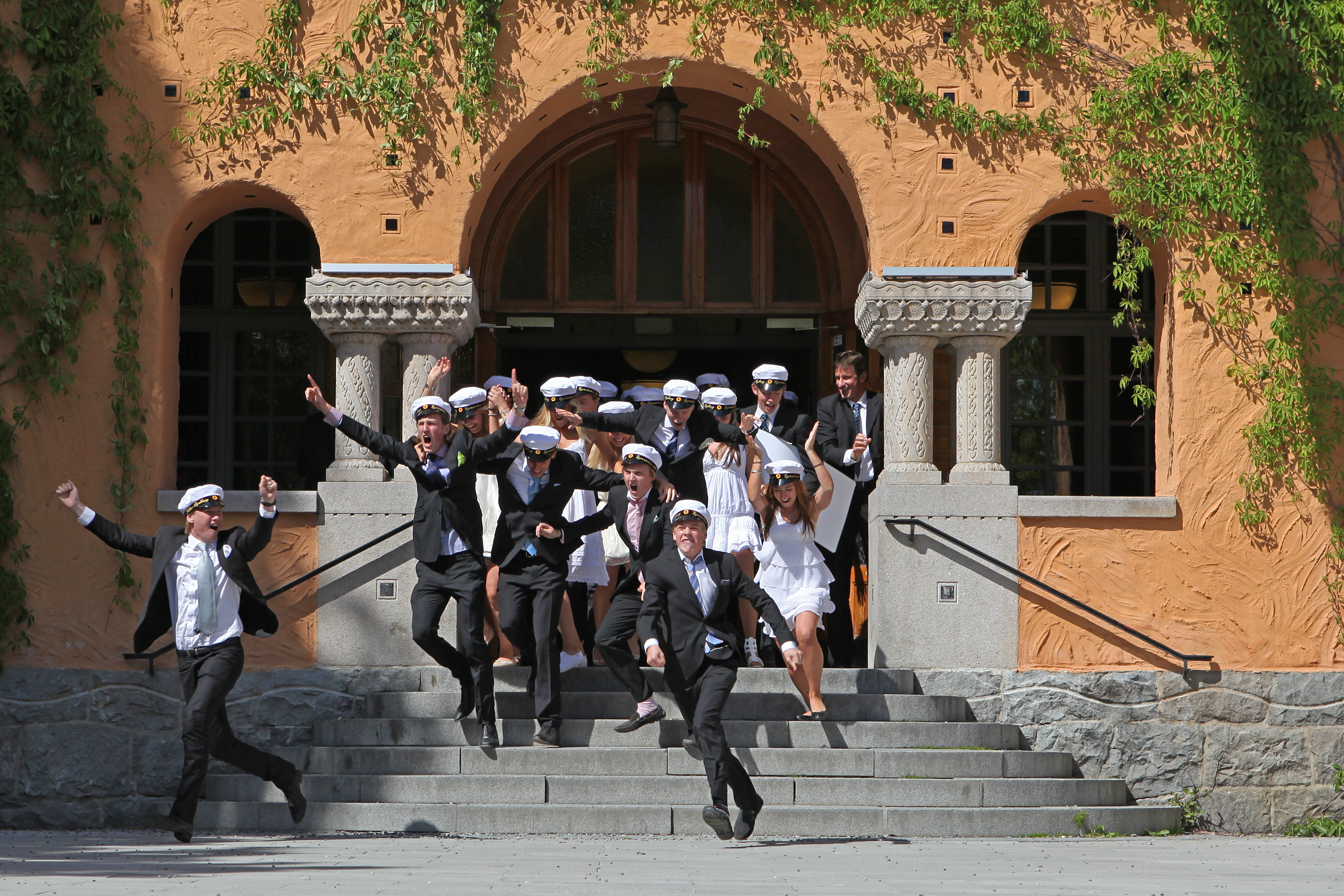
Graduates celebrating studenten

Studenten is the common name for the Swedish gymnasium (gymnasieskola) graduation and its associated traditions. Studenten marks the entry into adult life, as graduates are free to pursue further education or a full time employment.

== Traditions ==
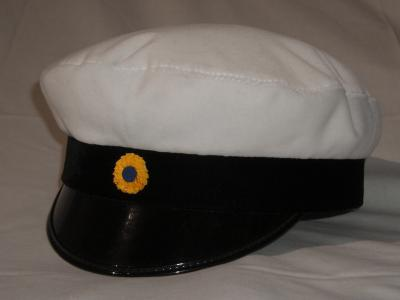
Swedish student cap

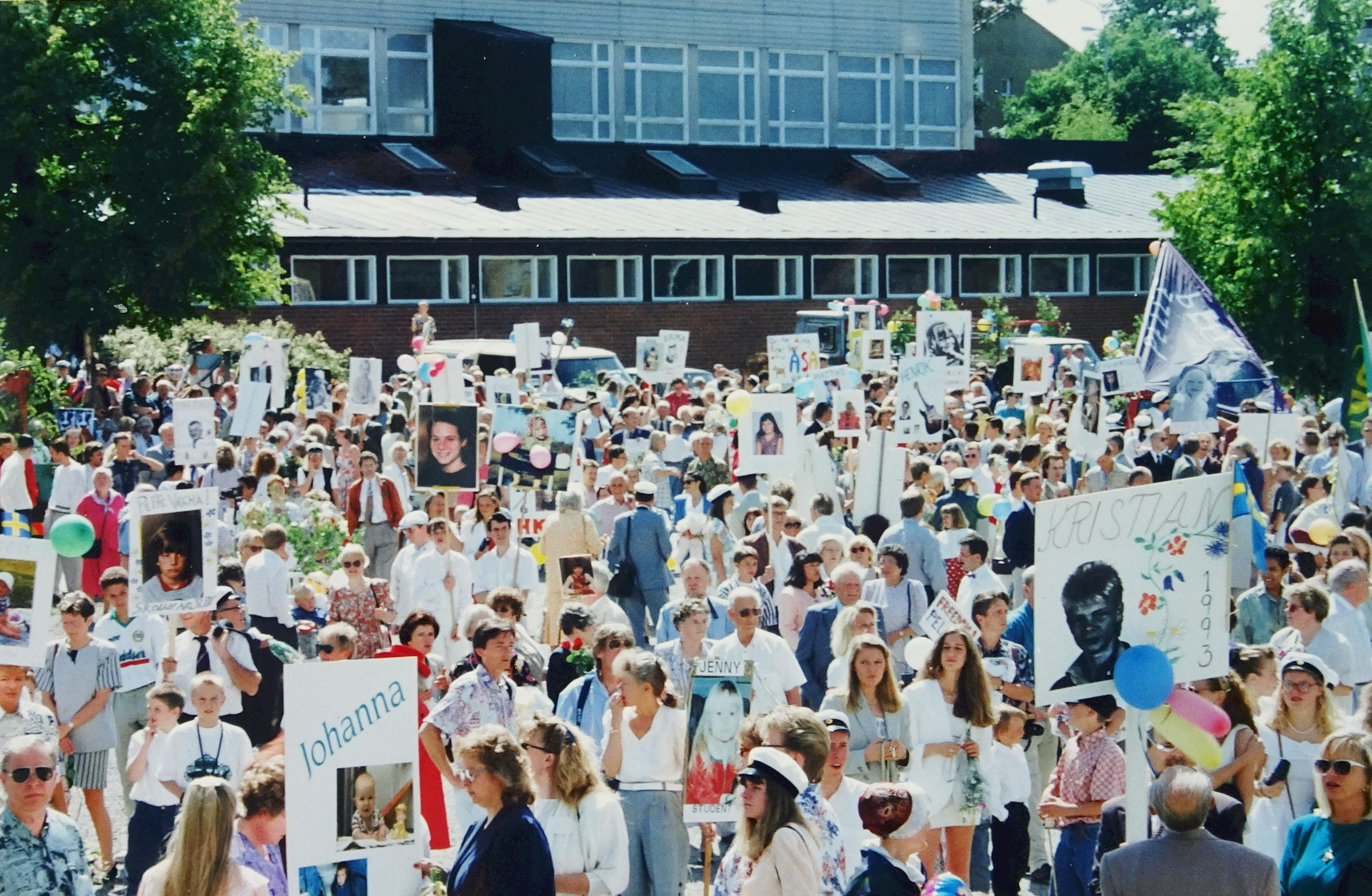
Baby pictures can be seen during "utspringet"

=== Student caps ===
During studenten, graduates traditionally wear a blue and white cap with a yellow and blue cockade at the front. It is common for schools to have a ceremony called mösspåtagning (literally 'putting on a cap') where soon-to-be graduates put on their caps. Nowadays, Swedish student caps can be customised extensively to the student's liking, and can thus become very expensive, often costing thousands of kronor. This has led to certain schools offering free caps and some students sewing their own caps.

=== Studentbal ===
Studentbalen ('student ball') is the Swedish equivalent of the prom, and is usually organised by the graduates a few weeks before graduation. Much like the prom, students usually go to studentbalen with a partner.

=== Champagne breakfast ===
A champagne breakfast (champagnefrukost) is commonly organised by the students on the morning of the graduation.

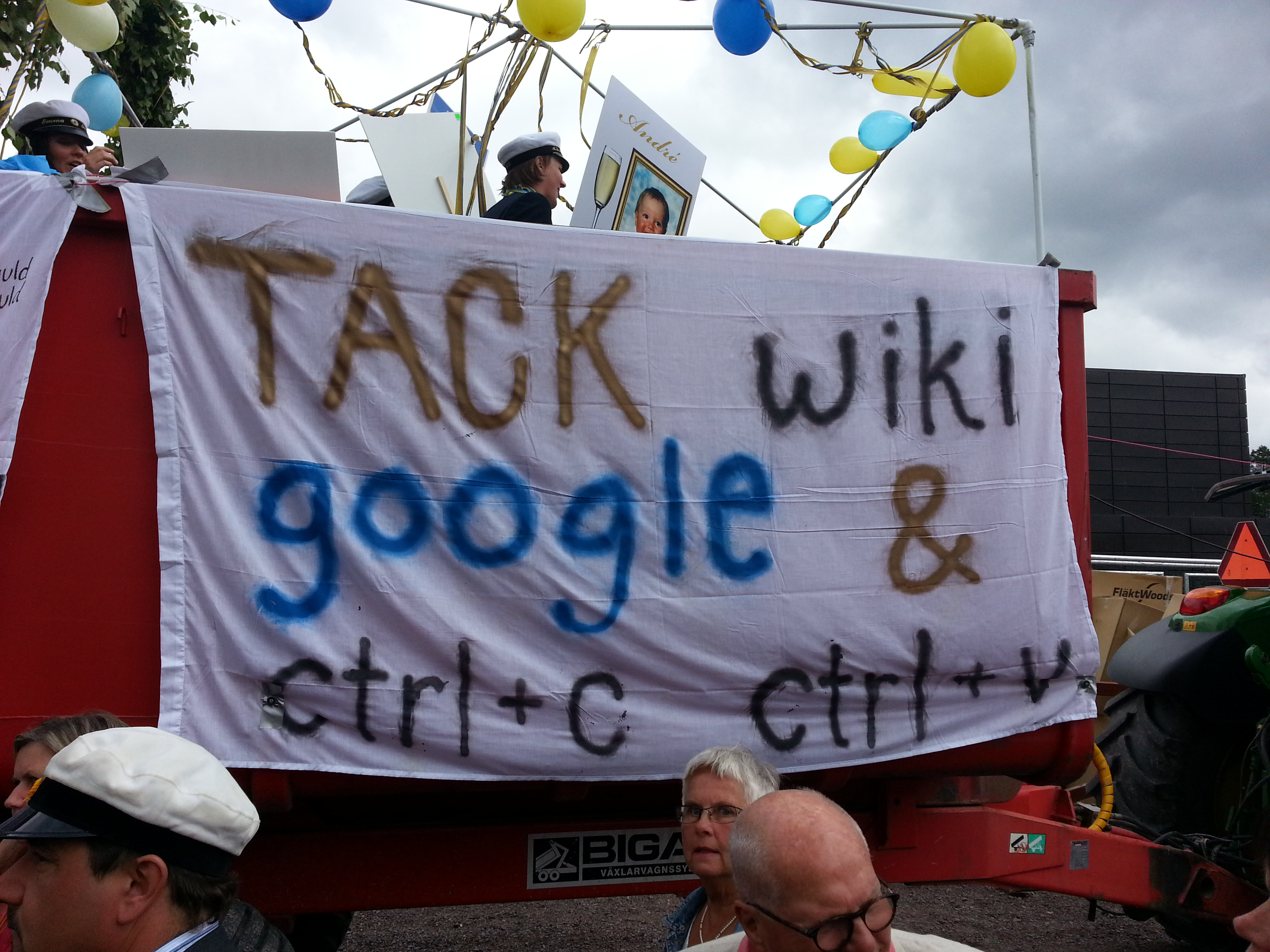
Studentflak

=== Utspringet ===
Utspringet (literally 'running out') is when the graduates run out of the school at the end of the graduation ceremony, to a crowd of relatives often holding a large poster of their own baby picture.

=== Studentflak ===
It is common for graduates to celebrate on a trailer travelling through town. This is referred to as studentflak ('student trailer').

=== Studentmottagning ===
After celebrating at school, individual graduates usually celebrate at home with their relatives. This is known as studentmottagning (literally 'student reception').

== Impact of the COVID-19 pandemic ==
During the COVID-19 pandemic, the celebrations were severely altered. In April, 2020, Swedish Minister for Education Anna Ekstöm announced that larger ceremonies wouldn't be allowed. Additionally, the exception which allowed for "studentflak" would be revoked. These restrictions affected those graduating in 2020 and 2021.
