= Manganeses de la Polvorosa =

Coordinates: 42°02′N 5°45′W

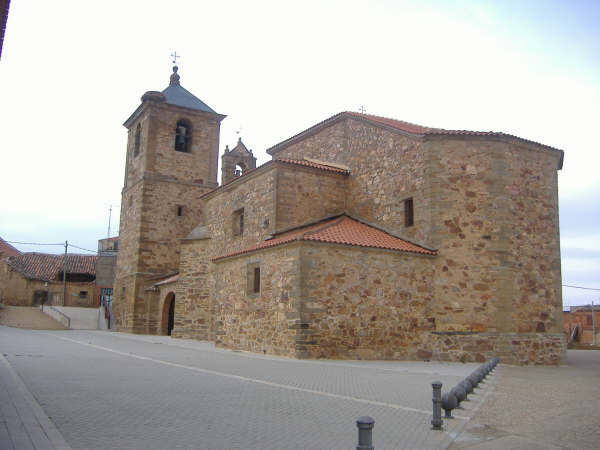
- Church of Saint Vincent Martyr

- Flag Coat of arms
- Interactive map of Manganeses de la Polvorosa
- Country: Spain
- Autonomous community: Castile and León
- Province: Zamora
- Municipality: Manganeses de la Polvorosa

Area
  - Total: 16 km^{2} (6.2 sq mi)

Population (2025-01-01)
  - Total: 637
  - Density: 40/km^{2} (100/sq mi)
- Time zone: UTC+1 (CET)
  - Summer (DST): UTC+2 (CEST)
- Website: Official website

Manganeses de la Polvorosa (Spanish pronunciation: [maŋɡaˈneses ðe la polβoˈɾosa]) is a municipality located in the province of Zamora, Castile and León, Spain. According to the 2022 census (INE), the municipality has a population of 623 inhabitants.

== See also ==
- Goat throwing
