= Wolfers (hunting) =

A wolfer with wolfhounds near Amedon, North Dakota, 1904

Wolfers was a term used to refer to both professional and civilian wolf hunters who operated in North America in the 19th and early 20th centuries.

During the gold rushes of the 1840s to the 1880s some of the participating men turned to wolfing when the harsh winters impeded their wagons. In 1860, the majority of wolfers were civilians who having failed to make their fortune on the Great Plains through minerals, transport or land, worked as menial laborers who hunted wolves as a formal occupation for extra income. Wolfers sold the wolf pelts to regional fur traders for up to two dollars each. Later, as the cattle industry expanded across the plains, wolvers cashed in on the bounties offered by many western states. In the three decades after 1865, wolfers had almost exterminated every wolf from Texas to the Dakotas, from Missouri to Colorado. It cost a wolfer about $150 to equip himself for a winter wolf hunt when the pelts were prime. An investment such as this could bring in up to $3,000 in furs over the course of three to four months. A typical method of killing wolves involved the shooting of a certain number of ungulates, lacing the carcasses with strychnine, then returning the next day to find the poisoned wolves. The majority of commercial wolfers in the 1870s worked for ranchers. Wolfer activities peaked from 1875–1895 as cattlemen increasingly blamed all economic shortfalls on wolf depredation, resulting in some dedicated hunters laying down poison in lines of up to 150 miles. Acts of fraud in the claiming of wolf bounties were not uncommon in this period. In some cases, wolfers would kill wolf pups and deliberately spare the mother in order to allow her to breed again the next year. Others would show one magistrate a wolf body part, while showing another a body part from the same animal, thus getting paid twice for the same kill.

On July 1, 1915, the US government hired its first government wolf hunters. Unlike the civilian bounty hunters of the prior century, the government hunters approached their work methodically and soberly. Before being disbanded on June 30, 1942, the US government hunters killed over 24,132 wolves.

In Canada, a government-backed wolf extermination programme was initiated in 1948 after serious declines in caribou herds in the Northern Territories and a rabies concern due to wolves migrating south near populated areas. 39,960 cyanide guns, 106,100 cyanide cartridges and 628,000 strychnine pellets were distributed. Up to 17,500 wolves were poisoned in Canada between 1955 and 1961. In the mid-1950s, wolf bounties were dropped in the western provinces in favour of hiring provincial hunters. Quebec's wolf bounties ended in 1971 and Ontario in 1972. Overall, 20,000 wolves were bountied between 1935–1955 in British Columbia, 12,000 between 1942–1955 in Alberta and 33,000 between 1947–1971 in Ontario.

== See also ==
- Luparii
- Wolf hunting
- Wolfcatcher Royal
- Fox hunting
