= Wolf hunting =

Practice of hunting wolves by humans

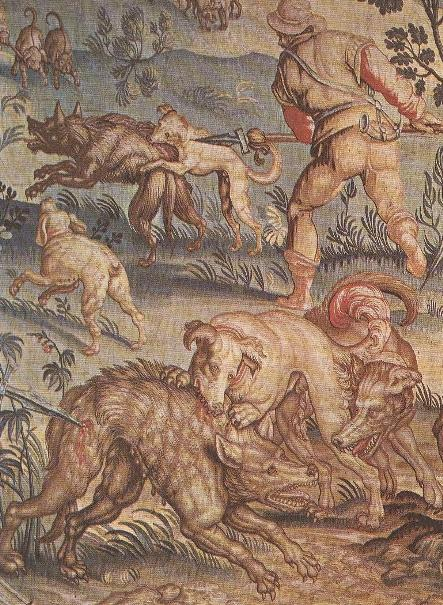
Tapestry depicting a Florentine wolf hunt (c. 14th century), Uffizi Gallery, Florence, Italy

Wolf hunting is the practice of hunting wolves. Wolves are mainly hunted for sport, for their skins, to protect livestock and, in some rare cases, to protect humans. Wolves have been actively hunted since 8,000 to 10,000 years ago, when they first began to pose a threat to livestock of Neolithic human communities. Historically, the hunting of wolves was a huge capital- and manpower-intensive operation. The threat wolves posed to both livestock and people was considered significant enough to warrant the conscription of whole villages under threat of punishment, despite the disruption of economic activities and reduced taxes. The hunting of gray wolves, while originally actively endorsed in many countries, has become a controversial issue across the world. Some people see it as cruel, unnecessary and based on misconceptions, while proponents argue that it is vital for the conservation of game herds and as pest control.

== History ==
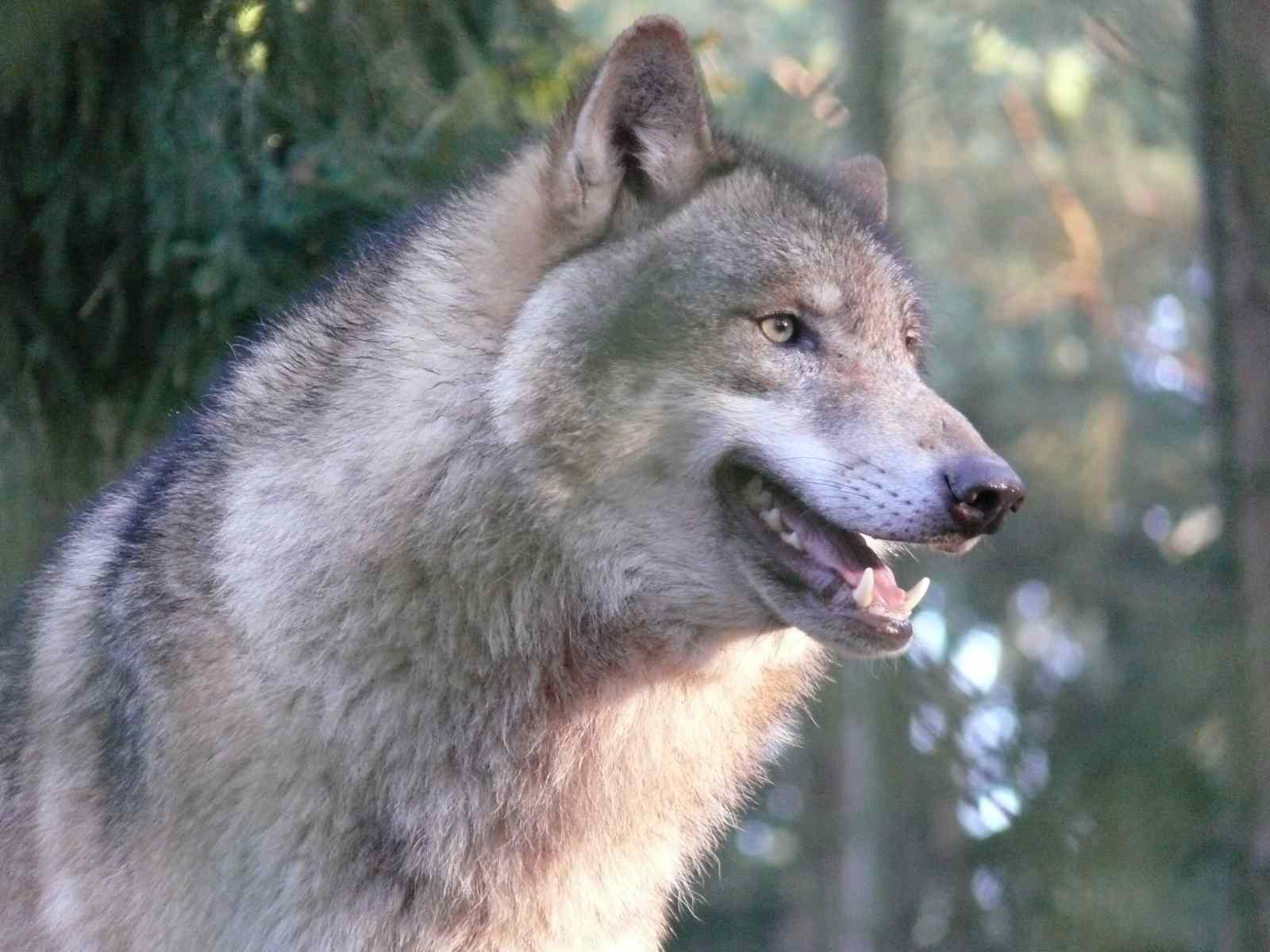
The European grey wolf (Canis lupus lupus) was a popular quarry in Europe of the Middle Ages.

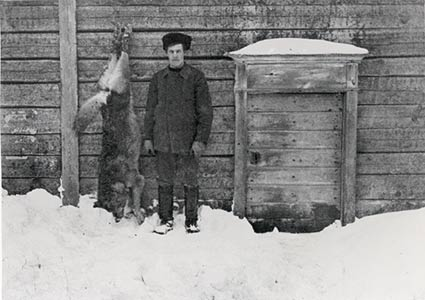
Farmer Ilmari Takkala and "the last wolf in Central Finland" he killed in Karstula

=== Europe and Russia ===
In the sixth century BC, the first wolf bounty was reportedly opened when Solon of Athens offered five silver drachmas to any hunter for killing any male wolf, and one for every female.

In Ancient Rome, the treatment given to wolves differed from the treatment meted out to other large predators. The Romans generally seem to have refrained from intentionally harming wolves. For instance, they were not hunted for pleasure (but only in order to protect herds that were out at pasture), and not displayed in the venationes, either. The special status of the wolf was not based on national ideology, but rather was connected to the religious importance of the wolf to the Romans.

==== British isles ====
In England of 950, King Athelstan imposed an annual tribute of 300 wolf skins on Welsh king Hywel Dda, an imposition which was maintained until the Norman conquest of England. At the time, several criminals, rather than being put to death, would be ordered to provide a certain number of wolf tongues annually. The Norman kings (reigning from 1066 to 1154) employed servants as wolf hunters and many held lands granted on condition they fulfilled this duty. William the Conqueror granted the lordship of Riddesdale in Northumberland to Robert de Umfraville on condition that he defend that land from enemies and wolves. There were no restrictions or penalties in the hunting of wolves, except in royal game reserves, under the reasoning that the temptation for a commoner to shoot a deer there was too great. King John gave a premium of 10 shillings for the capture of two wolves. King Edward I who reigned from 1272 to 1307 ordered the total extermination of all wolves in his kingdom and personally employed one Peter Corbet, with instructions to destroy wolves in the counties of Gloucestershire, Herefordshire, Worcestershire, Shropshire and Staffordshire, areas near the Welsh Marches where wolves were more common than in the southern areas of England. James I of Scotland passed a law in 1427 requiring three wolf hunts a year between April 25 to August 1, coinciding with the wolf's cubbing season. The wolf became extinct in England during the reign of Henry VII (1485–1509).

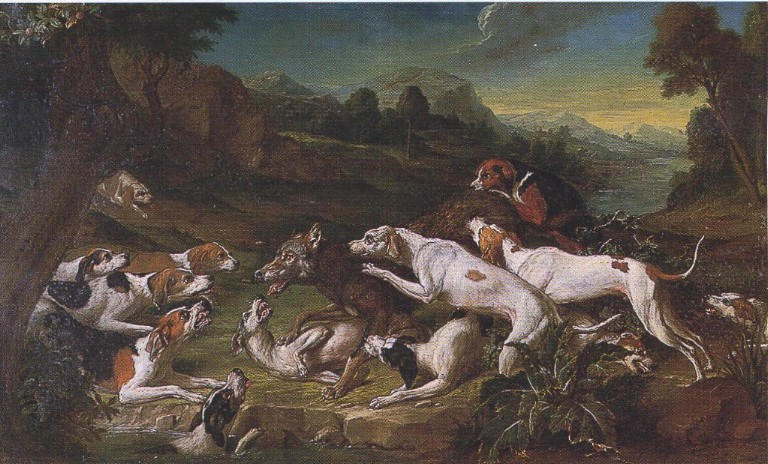
Wolf Hunt by Gerard Rijsbrack, depicting a wolf hunt by the French king's hounds, 3rd quarter of 18th century

It is known that wolves survived in Scotland up until the 18th century. Mary, Queen of Scots, is known to have hunted wolves in the forest of Atholl in 1563. Stories on the killing of the alleged last wolf of Scotland vary. Official records indicate that the last Scottish wolf was killed by Sir Ewan Cameron in 1680. Popular folklore on the other hand tells of how an old man named MacQueen of Pall à Chrocain in the Findhorn Valley of Morayshire killed the last wolf in 1743.

Ireland throughout most of the first half of the 17th century had a substantial wolf population of not less than 400 and may be as high as 1000 wolves at any one time. Although the Irish hunted wolves, it is evident from documentary data that they did not see the same need as the English to exterminate the wolves. Although wolves were perceived as threats, they were nonetheless seen as natural parts of the Irish landscapes. The level of rewards and bounties established by Oliver Cromwell's regime after the Cromwellian conquest of Ireland (1649–1653) attracted a few professional wolf hunters to Ireland, mostly from England. Politically, the prospect of numbers of armed Irish roaming around the country hunting wolves was not acceptable, given the ongoing conflict between the Irish and the new English settlers, so it was seen as much safer for the English authorities to encourage men from their own country to deal with the wolf problem. Wolves were exterminated from Ireland in the late 18th century, most likely 1786.

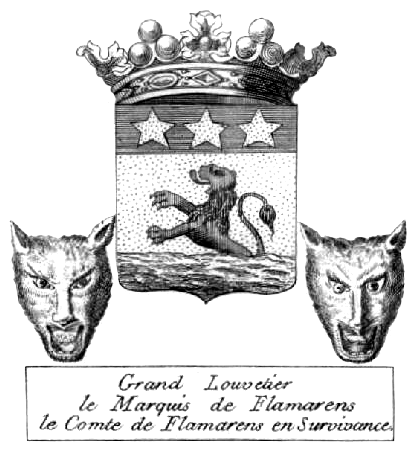
Coat of arms of The Marquis of Flamarens as Grand Wolfcatcher. The Grand Wolfcatcher placed his arms between two wolf heads as a symbol of the office.

==== Western and central Europe ====
In 9th century France, Charlemagne founded an elite corps of crown funded officials called luparii, whose purpose was to control wolf populations in France during the Middle Ages. Luparii were responsible for the initial reduction of wolf populations in France, which would become decimated in later centuries. The office of luparius is today known as the Wolfcatcher Royal. On 9 August 1787 the office of luparii was dissolved because of financing issues during the French Revolution but was reinstated twelve years later by Napoleon. After the Revolution ended, wolf hunting was no longer an activity reserved for the aristocracy. Wolves could be killed for monetary rewards equivalent to a month's pay. From 1818 to 1829, 1400 wolves were killed each year. This high kill rate coincided with the increased distribution of flintlocks. At the dawn of the 19th century, there were up to 5000 wolves in France, a number which was reduced to half that amount by 1850. By 1890, the wolf population had been reduced to 1000 animals, and further fell to 500 in 1900 because of increased usage of strychnine. Wolves temporarily increased during the First World War, though by the time it ended, the population was estimated to be between 150 and 200 animals. The last confirmed French wolf kill occurred in 1937. With the extinction of the wolf in metropolitan France, the office of Wolfcatcher Royal was modified in 1971 and now serves an administrative function regulating vermin and maintaining healthy wildlife populations.

Wolf bounties were regularly paid in Italy during the 12th and 13th centuries and as recently as the 1950s. Gian Galeazzo Visconti himself offered ten Imperial marks for every wolf killed. 600 wolves are recorded to have been bountied between the 14th and 19th centuries. Presentation of the killed wolf to the authorities was obligatory. The authorities had to give an accurate testimony with a description of the presented animal (gender, weight, measurements, color, estimated age, etc.) and the symptomatic ascertainment of any rabies infection. The wolf's paw was then amputated and/or its ears were sealed in wax in order to avoid the spoils being represented elsewhere. Only one case of fraud occurred, in 1834, which was punished by arrest. Italian wolf hunters lacked the organisation or determination of their French counterparts, having not formed any special hunting teams. Wolves were exterminated from the Alps in the 19th century, though they were never fully exterminated in the peninsula.

In Switzerland, conflicts between humans and wolves reached a peak in the 16th century, amid large-scale deforestation. Wolves became extinct in Zürich in 1684. They were later exterminated from Appenzell Ausserrhoden in 1695, and Schaffhausen in 1712. The last known traces of wolves in central Switzerland date back to 1707 in Zug, 1753 in Uri, and 1793 in Glarus. Wolves became extinct in Engadin in 1821. Between 1762 and 1842, 80 wolves were recorded to have been bountied in Vaud. Wolves were further exterminated in Valais in 1870, Ticino in 1872 and Solothurn in 1874. Wolves occasionally migrated to Switzerland in small numbers in the early 20th century. In 1908, a wolf was shot in Ticino, and a further two were killed in 1914 in Lignerolle.

In 19th century Spain, the Principality of Asturias passed an act between March and December 1816 paying out bounties for the death of 76 adult and 414 young wolves at 160 reales for an adult wolf and 32 for a wolf cub. The hunting of wolves represented a considerable source of wealth for local populations, with the lobero or wolf-hunter being a respected county figure.

In an 1856 brochure, the Hungarian nationalist exile István Türr noted, among many other grievances against Habsburg rule in his country, that "Since the restriction of the liberty of hunting and the seizure of all arms in Hungary, wild beasts have so multiplied, that, besides an enormous damage done to the crops, the flocks, and the poultry, the wolves venture, not only into villages, but into the very towns, and besides doing fearful depredations, attack even people. The number of "Kreisjäger" (district huntsmen appointed by the government) is not sufficient to destroy them; arid in consequence of the universal dislike to public functionaries, increased still more by the circumstance that they are not Hungarians, the landed proprietors do not allow them to hunt on their grounds. One of these huntsmen told me that a nobleman, being requested to allow him to kill some wolves which were in his forest, refused by saying, "No, sir! the wolves belong to me, not to the government."

In Croatia, between 1986 and 2004, 115 wolf deaths were recorded, of which 54% were due to shooting. During that period, the number of dead wolves found ranged from 0 to 15 annually. The lowest kill rates occurred in the late 1980s and early 1990s, coinciding with the start of the Croatian War of Independence.

==== Northern and eastern Europe ====
The Swedish kings Magnus Eriksson and Christopher of Bavaria decreed wolf hunting a civic duty, with only priests, parish clerks and landless women exempted. Sweden's first wolf bounty was opened in 1647. The bounties remained in force in the new laws of the Kingdom of Sweden from 1734. Hundreds of Sami killed wolves in order to protect their reindeer herds. In the 1960s, wolf numbers rapidly declined with the onset of snow mobiles used for hunting. Sweden's last wolf was killed in 1966, after which, the species was declared legally protected and eventually recolonized the area.

Norway followed a similar pattern as Sweden, with its last wolf being killed in 1976, before becoming being protected and eventually recolonizing the area.

In the Lithuanian SSR, the hunting of wolves was formally permitted all year long with killing cubs in their dens and payment of monetary rewards. The number of wolves in those times in Lithuania fell to about 20–40 individuals.

In Communist Romania, up to 2,800 wolves were killed between 1955 and 1965. During the reign of Nicolae Ceauşescu, a reward equal to a quarter of a month's pay was offered to rangers killing wolf cubs. Full-grown wolves killed by any method at all resulted in as much as a half-month's pay.

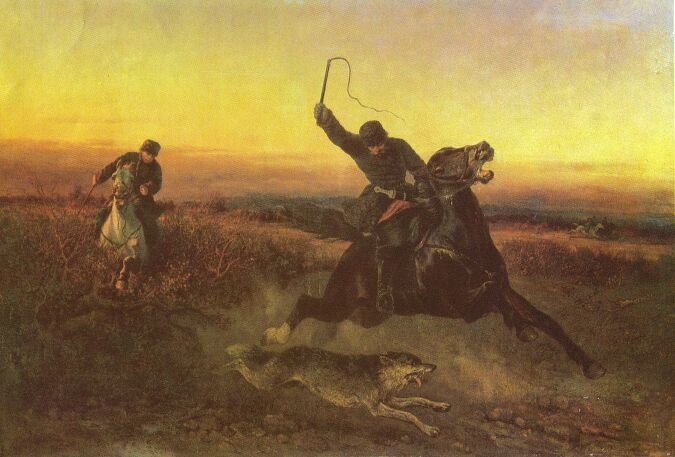
A Russian wolf hunt, as depicted in The Wolf Hunting by Nikolai Sverchkov, 1862

In Czarist Russia, before the emancipation reform of 1861, wolf hunting was done solely by authorized firearm holders, usually police, soldiers, rich landowners or nobles. Upon learning of the frequency of attacks on livestock and humans, the Ministry of the Interior sent agents to Western Europe in order to learn how the people there dealt with wolf problems. Upon returning, the Ministry of the Interior developed a plan in 1846 to deal with wolves involving the opening of wolf bounties and appointment of government hunters. Each hunter was given jurisdiction to hunt in one district, with more than one for large areas. Hunters were given 3 rubles for each male wolf killed and 1.5 for each cub, with a tail presented as proof. Each hunter would receive an annual salary of 60 rubles a year, provided he killed 15 adults and 30 cubs a year. Peasant hunters, however, were rarely rewarded, because of corrupt bureaucrats stealing the money. In 1858, after paying the equivalent of $1,250,000 for over a million wolves in Central Russia, officials became suspicious, and discovered that some hunters bought wolf pelts for low prices, cut them up and handed them to magistrates as wolf tails. In the later years of the 19th century, Russian hunting societies began an energetic campaign against wolves. In 1897, members of the Moscow Hunting Society killed their first 1000 wolves, though the number of professional wolf hunters at the time was rather low. Former serfs began hunting wolves after their emancipation in 1861, though rarely with success, as civilian firearms were highly expensive, and the cheaper ones were usually primitive and unable to bear the heavy ammunition necessary to kill wolves.

After the October Revolution in 1917, the newly formed Soviet government worked heavily to eradicate wolves and other predators during an extensive land reclamation program. During World War II, wolf populations increased, though after Nazi Germany's defeat, wolf hunts resumed. With the end of the war and the onset of aerial hunting, the USSR destroyed 42,300 wolves in 1945, 62,700 wolves in 1946, 58,700 wolves in 1947, 57,600 in 1948, and 55,300 in 1949. From 1950 to 1954, an average of 50,000 wolves were killed annually. In 1966, wolves had been successfully exterminated in 30 oblasts of the RSFSR. During this time, wolf predation on humans and livestock had dropped by a factor of ten. However, with the publishing of a Russian translation of Farley Mowat's book Never Cry Wolf, wolf hunts decreased in popularity. Amid public outcry, Czarist and Soviet records of wolf attacks on both livestock and people were ignored and wolf hunts decreased in number, allowing wolves to multiply. 15,900 wolves were reportedly culled from the RSFSR in 1978, compared to 7,900 two years prior. With an increase in population, twice as many wolves were culled in the 1980s than in the prior decade. Wolves became extinct in Wrangel Island in the early 1980s. In 1984, the RSFSR had over 2,000 wolf hunting brigades consisting of 15,000 hunters who killed 16,400 wolves. Overall, the Soviet Union culled over 1,500,000 wolves for a cost of 150,000,000 rubles on bounties alone. With the dissolution of the Soviet Union, many wolf bounties were lowered or dropped altogether. Wolf hunting continues in Russia, at the expense of individual hunters rather than the government.

=== Asia ===
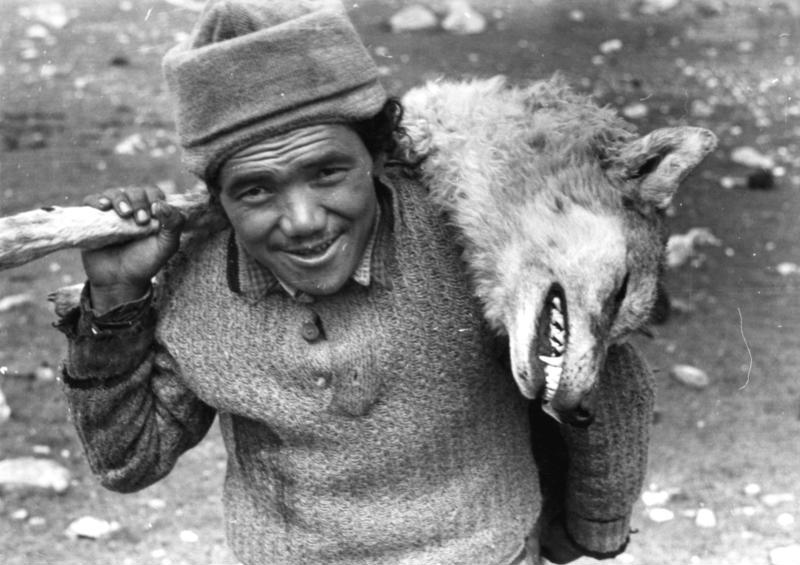
A Tibetan wolf, hunted in Tibet in 1938

In India, Hindus traditionally considered the hunting of wolves, even dangerous ones, as taboo, for fear of causing a bad harvest. The Santals, however, considered them fair game, as with every other forest dwelling animal. In 1876, in the North-West Provinces and Bihar State of British India, 2,825 wolves were killed in response to 721 fatal attacks on humans. Two years later, 2,600 wolves were killed in response to attacks leaving 624 humans dead. Wolf exterminations remained a priority in the NWP and Awadh through to the 1920s, because wolves were reportedly killing more people than any other predator in the region. Female cubs were bountied for 12 Indian annas, while males for 8. Higher rewards of 5 rupees for each adult and one for each cub were favored in Jaunpur. In Gorakhpur, where human fatalities were highest in summer, the reward for an adult wolf was 4 rupees, with 3 for a cub. Acts of fraud were quite common, with some bounty hunters presenting golden jackals or simply exhuming the bodies of bountied wolves and presenting them to unsuspecting magistrates for rewards. Overall, it is thought that up to 100,000 wolves were killed in British India between 1871 and 1916.

Before the onset of the Meiji Restoration period in 1868, wolves had a benign rather than noxious place in Japanese culture and folklore. Wolves were, however, occasionally hunted. Wolf bounties (shōkin) first appeared in Morioka where horse predation by wolves was frequent. Domain lords would pay 700 mon for males, and 900 for females, though peasants received much less. Wolves in Japan became extinct during the Meiji Restoration period, an extermination known as ōkami no kujo. The wolf was deemed a threat to ranching which the Meiji government promoted at the time, and targeted via a bounty system and a direct chemical extermination campaign inspired by the similar contemporary American campaign. Starting August 1875, the Iwate Prefecture government offered bounties (shōreikin) of 7¥ for male wolves and 8 for females. In 1878 in Sapporo, it was decided to set higher bounties for wolves than bears in order to further motivate the ethnic Ainu people into killing wolves, which were once considered sacred to them. Hokkaido experienced significant development during this period and the Hokkaido wolf also suffered from resulting environmental disruption. The last Japanese wolf was a male killed on 23 January 1905 near Washikaguchi (now called Higashi Yoshiro). The carcass was bought by a man working for the Duke of Bedford, and was subsequently put on display in the British Museum of Natural History.

In the Mongolian People's Republic, the Mongolian People's Revolutionary Party organized two national wolf hunting weeks, one in March and another in December. Anyone who killed a wolf and presented a pair of ears as proof was rewarded with a sheep and some felt. Each May, the government commanded the populace to scour the countryside for wolf lairs in an effort to exterminate wolf pups. When the inhabitants of a district believed it had destroyed its last wolf, the local government would proclaim a public holiday. Records show that up to 5,000 wolves were taken annually in the early 1930s. 4,000–4,500 wolves were killed annually in Mongolia in 1976.

In the Kazakh SSR, some 1,000 professional hunters killed thousands of the wolves yearly to collect government bounties. In 1988, just before the Soviet economy collapsed, the hunters killed 16,000 wolves.

=== North America ===
In the majority of Native American hunter-gatherer societies, wolves were usually killed for body parts used in rituals, or to stop them raiding food caches, though some tribes would raid wolf dens to kill pups when wolf populations became too great for the Natives to live with. This also served as a method of acquiring food, as wolf pups were considered a delicacy. Native Americans were aware of the dangers of habituated wolves, and would quickly dispatch wolves following them too closely. Active hunting of wolves was rare because many tribes believed that such an act would cause game animals to disappear or bring retribution from other wolves. The Cherokee feared that the unjust killing of a wolf would bring about the vengeance of its pack mates, and that the weapon used for the deed would be useless in future unless exorcised by a medicine man. However, they would kill wolves with impunity if they knew the proper rites of atonement, and if the wolves themselves happened to raid their fish nets. When the Kwakiutl killed a wolf, the animal would be laid out on a blanket and have portions of its flesh eaten by the perpetrators, who would express regret at the act before burying it. The Ahtna would take the dead wolf to a hut, where it would be propped in a sitting position with a banquet made by a shaman set before it. When men from certain Inuit tribes killed a wolf, they would walk around their houses four times, expressing regret and abstaining from sexual relations with their wives for four days. Young Apaches would kill wolves, cougars or bears as a rite of passage. Although some of the first European colonists traveling to North America would report back that wolves were more populous in the New World than in Europe, writings from the Lewis and Clark Expedition indicate that wolves were seldom seen except in aboriginal buffer zones.

A wolfer with wolfhounds near Amedon, North Dakota, 1904

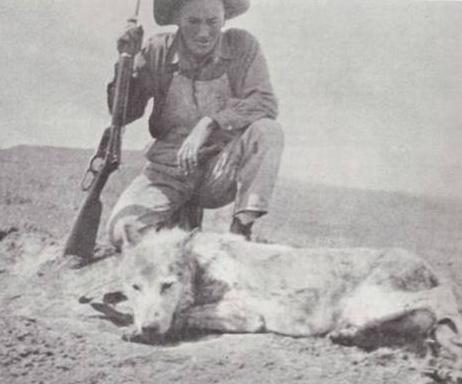
Clyde F. Briggs stands over Three Toes of Harding County.

After the European colonization of the Americas, the first American wolf bounty was passed by the Massachusetts Bay Colony on November 9, 1630. Further wolf bounties opened in Jamestown, Virginia on September 4, 1632, and in other colonies. Payments to white settlers included cash, tobacco, wine and corn, while Native Americans were given blankets and trinkets. A New Jersey law started in 1697 stated that any white Christian who brought a wolf carcass to a magistrate would have been paid 20 shillings, while a Native American or Black person would have been paid half that much. It later became customary for Native Americans to provide two wolf pelts a year without payment. In 1688, a Virginia law abolished the requirement of tribute in wolves to be paid in accordance to the number of hunters in each tribe, demanding 725 hunters to kill 145 wolves a year. In the 19th century, as the settlers began increasingly moving west in pursuit of more land for ranching, wolves were becoming increasingly more hunted as threats to livestock. In 1818, a "War of Extermination" against wolves and bears was declared in Ohio. Iowa began its own wolf bounty in 1858, with Wisconsin and Colorado following suit in 1865 and 1869. Wolf pelts soon began to increase in demand as beavers began to become scarce from over-trapping. In the 1830s, a wolf pelt was worth only $1, doubling in the 1850s. Records of the upper Missouri outfit of the American Fur Trading Company indicate that 20 wolf pelts were shipped down-river in 1850, with 3,000 being shipped three years later. Civilians turned bounty hunters known as "wolfers" began killing ungulates in large numbers as bait, poisoning the meat in hopes of attracting unsuspecting wolves. It is estimated that between 1871 and 1875, this method killed thirty-four thousand wolves in Montana and Alberta alone.

In the late 19th and early 20th centuries, wolf hunting could become a cultural event as large numbers of people advanced through wolf territory in hopes of flushing any animals from hiding. In these types of hunts, firearms and dogs were forbidden, and the wolves were killed with clubs or otherwise by hand.

Between 1916 and 1926 the National Park Service predator control program resulted in the extermination of sustainable packs of wolves in Yellowstone National Park by 1926. American wolf hunts peaked in the 1920s-1930s, when up to 21,000 were killed annually. After World War II, wolves were seen less as vermin and more as big game trophy animals.

In 1978 the Endangered Species Act (ESA) labeled gray wolves as an endangered species in the contiguous United States, except for in Minnesota, and federally protected gray wolves from hunting. In response to recovery progress of wolf populations under the act, the Fish and Wildlife Service proposed in 2013 to delist gray wolves from ESA, though the proposal failed as it was not supported by adequate science. In instances of delisting, federal protection is removed and states are left to manage their own wolf populations. Some states with residing wolf populations have notably few regulations on wolf hunting, as in Idaho where there is no bag limit for gray wolves, and hunting is allowed throughout the year.

In ranges of the United States where there are concentrated populations of wolves, the Fish and Wildlife service can divide wolves into Distinct Population Segments (DPSs) which allow protections to vary depending on the recovery status of each wolf population. In the 2000s, proposed DPSs designations for the gray wolf were coupled with delisting or down-listing actions, which removed federal protections against wolf hunting. District courts dismissed these proposals on the account that it went against the purpose of the ESA. The only remaining DPS is the Northern Rocky Mountain DPS, which includes a range shared between 6 states. The wolf population within this range is not listed as endangered and is not protected from hunting.

The first Canadian wolf bounty was offered in 1793 in Ontario and Quebec. Wolves became rare in Eastern Canada by the 1870s, becoming extinct in New Brunswick by 1880, in Nova Scotia by 1900 and had disappeared from Newfoundland by 1913. Full-scale eradication programs did not peak in western and northern Canada until the 1950s, when resource development brought more people into originally sparsely populated wilderness. A government-backed wolf extermination program was initiated in 1948 after serious declines in caribou herds in the Northern Territories and a rabies concern due to wolves migrating south near populated areas. 39,960 cyanide guns, 106,100 cyanide cartridges and 628,000 strychnine pellets were distributed. Up to 17,500 wolves were poisoned in Canada between 1955 and 1961. In the mid-1950s, wolf bounties were dropped in the western provinces in favor of hiring provincial hunters. Quebec's wolf bounties ended in 1971 and Ontario in 1972. Overall, 20,000 wolves were bountied between 1935 and 1955 in British Columbia, 12,000 between 1942 and 1955 in Alberta and 33,000 between 1947 and 1971 in Ontario. Unlike wolf populations in the lower 48 states, which declined steadily as settlers moved west, the Canadian wolf population fluctuated between growth and decline, largely because the human population in Canada never reached the same level as in the lower 48, thus leaving large areas of land free for the wolves.

Unlike European wolf hunts which were usually reserved for the nobility, North American wolf hunts were partaken by ordinary citizens, nearly all of them possessing firearms, thus the extermination of wolves in the lower 48 states was carried out in far less time than in Europe.

By the 1960s the population of wolves decreased dramatically because people in North America have hunted wolves for a variety of purposes. For example, wolf hunting allowed people to acquire fur, which was further used in a variety of practical ways. It also allowed people to gain control over the spread of diseases transmitted by the animals and enabled people to better protect their livestock. The circumstances finally started to change in the 1960s, as people finally start to realise that the wolf population had reached a crucially low point and had to be saved and put under the legal protection of the government. Environmental movement was transforming the public views on the issue and that was the starting point of the wolf population recovery. United States federal government took the issue under its control and enacted the Endangered Species Act of 1973 to help protect and restore the wolf population. The Endangered Species Act of 1973 restricted the killing of wolves and labeled them as endangered animals in 48 contiguous states. The grey wolf (Canis lupus) was one of the main subspecies to be classified as endangered, along with others such as the Northern Rocky Mountain wolf, Eastern Timber wolf, as well as Red wolf and Mexican wolf. Since the wolf recovery journey began, under the protection of the law, wolf population numbers went up throughout the northern United States. For example, Minnesota's recovery efforts positively influenced the wolf population and resulted in an increase their numbers from 200 to 350 between 1974 and 1990.

== Current situation ==
=== Europe and Russia ===
In Norway, in 2001, the government authorized a controversial wolf cull on the grounds that the animals were overpopulating and were responsible for the killing of more than 600 sheep in 2000. The Norwegian authorities' original plans to kill 20 wolves were scaled down amid public outcry. However, sheep farmers generally welcome wolf hunting, as the wolves are a great threat to sheep and dogs. In 2005, the Norwegian government proposed another cull, with the intent of exterminating 25% of Norway's wolf population.

As of 2015, there were an estimated 460 wolves in the Scandinavian population, with the large majority located in Sweden. Wolf hunting is controversial in Sweden, where decisions by public authorities to authorize hunting seasons each year since 2010 have resulted in legal challenges by the European Commission and by NGOs.

In Spain, wolves were hunted north of the Duero river under strict conditions to control damage over livestock, but strictly protected at the South margin. The recent Wolf expansion even to the mountains of Madrid, has generated a great controversy in Autonomous Community of Castile-León over whether to allow hunting also south of the Duero river. As of 2021 the wolf hunt has been banned in all of Spain.

The European Union has exceptionally permitted Estonia, which has the highest wolf density in the EU, to continue wolf hunting as long as the overall numbers remain stable. In 2010, 173 wolves were permitted to be culled, but only 130 were actually caught. In 2011, 149 wolves were culled of the permitted 150.

Under the Berne Convention wolves in France are listed as an endangered species, and killing them is illegal, though official culls are permitted to protect farm animals as long as there is no threat to the species in its entirety.

Though wolf populations have increased in Ukraine, wolves remain unprotected there and can be hunted year-round by permit-holders.

Bulgaria considers the wolf a pest animal and there is a bounty equivalent to two weeks average wages on their heads.

With the exception of specimens in nature reserves, wolves in Belarus are largely unprotected. They are designated a game species, and bounties ranging between 60 and 70 Euros are paid to hunters for each wolf killed. This is a considerable sum in a country where the average monthly wage is 230 Euros.

In Russia, government-backed wolf exterminations have been largely discontinued since the fall of the Soviet Union. As a result, their numbers have stabilized and are increasing, though they are still hunted legally. According to Alexander Tikhonov, head of the Department of Hunting Resources "the more wolves you have, the more problems there are". His department currently licenses a national bag limit of up to 14,000 wolves annually, with permits given to hunt even within nature reserves. Currently, Russia is the only nation where poison is legally used to kill wolves. The government licensed a fluorine-acetate-barium compound and distributed it through hunting associations.

=== Asia ===
Since the fall of the Soviet Union, wolf hunting in Kazakhstan has decreased in profit. About 2,000 are killed yearly for a $40 bounty, though the animal's numbers have risen sharply.

Wolf hunting has become a fashionable pastime for Mongolia's new capitalist rich, particularly around Ulaanbaatar. It is currently illegal to shoot animals from helicopters or jeeps, though many rich hunters do not pay attention to this, including the lawmakers. For Mongolian nomads, hunting wolves is more than a rich man's hobby because of evocations to the wolf's role in their mythology. Most post-Soviet Mongols have reverted to the traditional belief that to kill a wolf in January, or even to see one, brings good fortune for the whole year.

In 2006, the government of the People's Republic of China began plans to auction licenses for foreigners to hunt wild animals, including wolves which are the only carnivores on the list of animals that can be hunted. The license to shoot a wolf can apparently be acquired for $200.

=== North America ===
In Alaska, it is illegal to shoot a wolf with a rimfire rifle because wolves are classified as big game. The state predator control program includes aerial shooting. In 2007 state biologists' goal was to have volunteer hunters kill 407 to 680 wolves by the time the predator-control season ended April 30, but high fuel prices and poor flying conditions kept hunters from meeting that goal. A subsidy of $150 per wolf offered by the Alaska Department of Fish and Game was overturned by a judge on the grounds that only the Board of Game had the power to offer bounties. Despite relatively heavy hunting and trapping over the last century in Alaska, wolves occur on nearly all of their traditional habitat throughout mainland Alaska. Alaska currently has five wolf control programs that comprise about 9.4% of the state's land area. A closely controlled permit system is used in allowing aerial or airborne methods to remove wolves in designated areas. Wolf numbers are temporarily reduced in these areas, but are not permanently eliminated from any area. Wolf populations in North America commonly sustain annual harvests or natural mortality rates of 20–40% without experiencing a year-to-year decline in numbers. Sarah Palin of Alaska in 2007 approved the use of this provision in the law to shoot wolves and bears while flying for the purpose of protection of property.

Many scientists believe that this artificial inflation of game populations is actually detrimental to both caribou and moose populations as well as the ecosystem as a whole; artificially boosted populations "could result in habitat destruction by moose and caribou, and ultimately, a crash in these populations". This is why large numbers of people support the Protect America's Wildlife (PAW) Act which was proposed to Congress by George Miller, the state representative of California in July 2009. This legislation has already received official support from nine former members of the Alaska Board of Game and Wildlife and conservation groups, including Defenders of Wildlife. According to Miller, "The state of Alaska has been operating an airborne hunting program that has blatantly ignored federal law, ignored Alaskans' opposition, ignored the science, and ignored even their own wildlife experts. It's time to ground this air assault on wolves. The PAW Act is urgently needed to close the loophole in federal law and protect our nation's wildlife from the unethical and unsportsmanlike practice of airborne hunting." The PAW Act has been created to close the loophole in the existing Airborne Hunting Act that has allowed Alaska legislators and officials to continue to aerial hunt. The bill would clarify under which conditions it is acceptable to use aircraft to aid in the management of wildlife. It would bar states from using aerial hunting to artificially boost game species when they are not at risk and to clarify the prohibition of harassing animals from planes which is part of the "land and shoot" hunting that is being utilized in Alaska. The PAW Act acknowledges the right of states to manage wildlife by clearly stating that wildlife agencies may use planes to respond to legitimate biological emergencies in wildlife populations. It also states that aircraft may be used for animal control where land, livestock, water, pets, crops, or human health are at risk.

An estimated 15% of Canada and Alaska's wolf population of 6,000-7,000 is eliminated annually. (Canada's total wolf population is about 30,000.) Ontario ceased its wolf bounty system in 1972, though retaining a year-round open season for wolves. In Alberta, wolves bounties are still offered by some local governments. Starting in 2010, Big Lakes County offered a bounty of C$300 per adult wolf, leading to 290 wolves worth $87,000 by mid-2012.

After the gray wolf was removed from the endangered species list for the western great lakes region in January 2012, the Minnesota Department of Natural Resources instituted a hunting season to manage the population. This new season ran from November 3, 2012, through the 18th, 2012 in some regions and continued November 24, 2012 and ran through January 31, 2013 or until the tag limit was reached. That limit was set at a target of 400 wolves across the state. The total number of wolves killed in this inaugural season was 412 wolves. Twelve more wolves were killed past the target number.

On December 19, 2014, a US Federal Court ordered a stop to the hunting of wolves in Minnesota, Wisconsin and in Michigan.

In the United States hunting wolves became legal again once Trump's administration issued the policy which took away Endangered Species Act protections for endangered gray wolves. States then resumed the fight against gray wolves as the federal government was no longer protecting wolves. Making the hunting of wolves legal destroyed packs of wolves, and niches. Hunting wolves can have destructive impacts on their population as it can break up packs. Smaller packs of wolves have a harder time finding food to survive as they cannot carry bigger prey. One pack member hunted has a tremendous impact on the pact. A research paper published in the Journal of Animal Ecology in 2014, confirmed the impact of the loss of one wolf. Findings included that where a pack broke apart, dissolution followed by a loss of an alpha. The grey wolf pack and population is highly susceptive to the fate of breeders.

The current situation in the western United States allows for the hunting and trapping of wolves during designated seasons. As of 2022 in Montana, hunters can hunt up to 10 wolves and trap up to 10 wolves for a combined total of up to 20 wolves. The majority of wolves hunted in Montana were originally re-introduced in the protected Yellowstone National Park but are not safe from hunting once the wolves exit the park's land. It has been reported that some wolves have been hunted merely 10 miles from the park's border with one in 2020 wearing a scientific radio collar. As of January 9, 2022 more Yellowstone wolves which have wandered outside of the Park have been hunted and killed than any season since their species reintroduction in 1995.

A federal judge later restored protections for gray wolves in much of the United States. This action essentially reversed Trump's Policy where he eliminated all protections for endangered gray wolves. With protection, gray wolves are better off than they were previously. However, this restoration did not restore protections for wolves in the northern Rockies. This is where their population is being aggressively hunted which is prevalently shown through the number of wolves still being killed. February 10, 2022, was when a court order for gray wolves was issued in the contiguous 48 states and Mexico to protect the gray wolves under the Endangered Species Act (ESA). The gray wolves were able to protected again Senior District Judge Jeffrey S. White, of the United States District Court for the Northern District of California declared removing protection did not consider threats outside of the Great Lakes and Northern Rocky Mountains.

With regards to Wolf hunting in other Western States, the laws vary drastically. In Oregon although the gray wolf, Canis lupus, was controversially removed from the state's endangered species list, the killing of wolves remains strictly illegal. This includes a ban on all trapping and hunting of the species in any part of the state for any reason. Contrary to Oregon's strict laws, the state's neighbor to the east, Idaho, has very different laws. In Idaho, the trapping of wolves on private property is legal year round. In addition to trapping, there is no limit to the number of tags wolf hunters can possess, therefore making the hunting of wolves legal year round in the state of Idaho. As a result of the change in legislation, the killing of wolves is incredibly similar to that of coyotes and foxes in the state currently.

A 2025 Science Advances study, which examined lifestock predation by wolves in Montana and Idaho (where wolf hunting is permitted) and Oregon and Washington (where hunting remains illegal), found that public wolf hunting had a negligible impact on lifestock predation. The authors of the study wrote that the findings challenge wolf hunting as an effective management strategy for reducing lifestock predation. Despite this, in 2025, the Montana Fish Park and Wildlife plans to cut its wolf population in half by allowing almost 500 wolves to be killed, and each hunter to kill 15 wolves each.

== Quarry ==
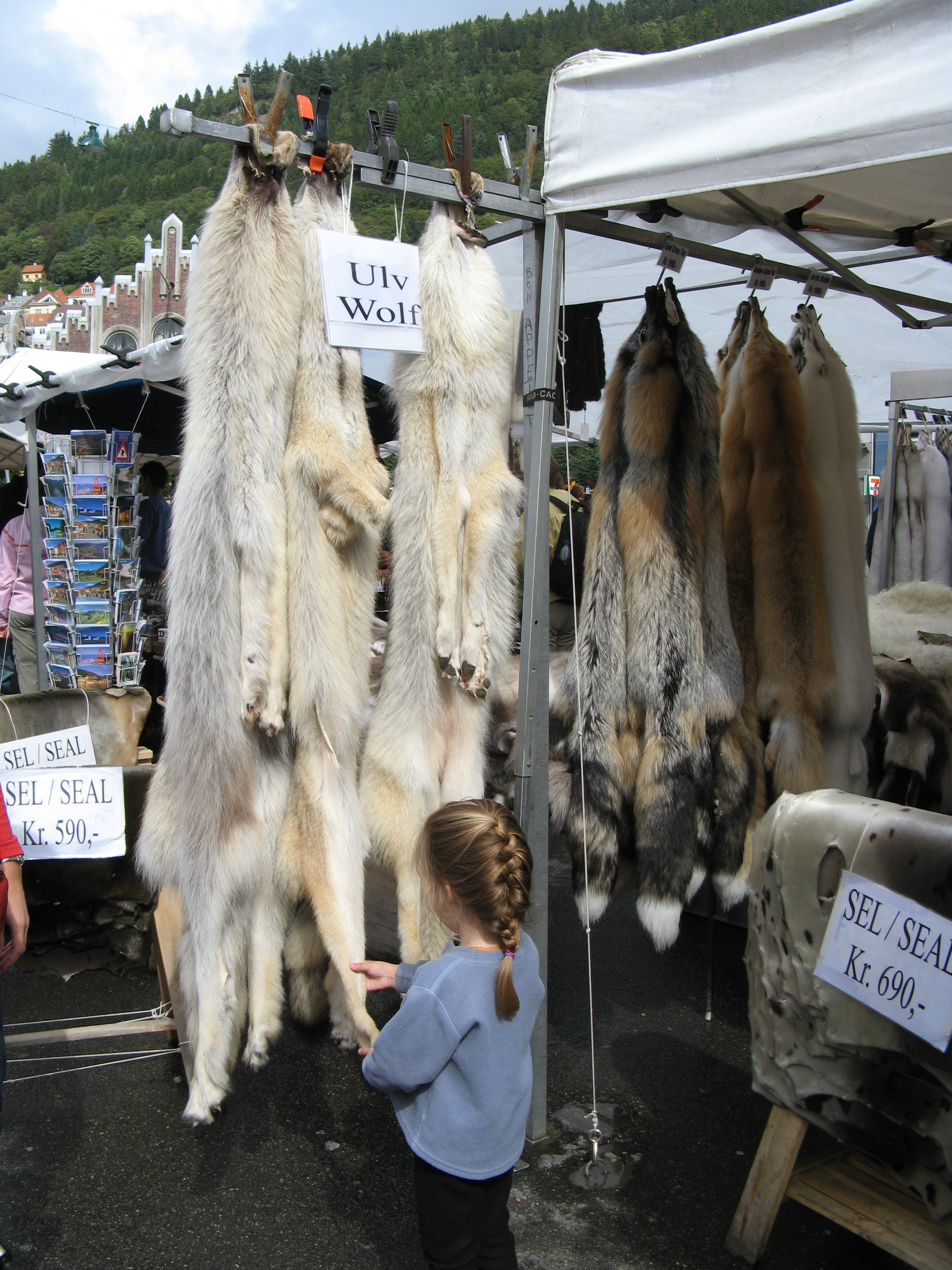
Gray wolf skins at the Bergen fishmarket, Norway

The grey wolf (Canis lupus) is the largest member of the Canidae. Though once abundant over much of North America and Eurasia, the grey wolf inhabits a very small portion of its former range because of widespread destruction of its habitat; in some regions it is endangered or threatened. Considered as a whole, however, the grey wolf is regarded as of least concern for extinction according to the International Union for the Conservation of Nature and Natural Resources. Wolf weight and size can vary greatly worldwide, tending to increase proportionally with latitude as predicted by Bergmann's Rule. Wolves are usually hunted in heavy brush and are considered especially challenging to hunt, because of their elusive nature and sharp senses. Grey wolves are notoriously shy and difficult to kill, having been stated to be almost as hard to stalk as cougars, and being far more problematic to dispatch with poison, traps or hounds. However, wolves generally do not defend themselves as effectively as cougars or bears.

Some wolves will evade capture for very long periods of time and display great cunning. One specimen nicknamed "Three Toes of Harding County" in South Dakota eluded his pursuers for 13 years before finally being caught. Another wolf nicknamed "Rags the digger" near Meeker, Colorado would deliberately ruin trap lines by digging up traps without tripping them. In sport hunting, wolves are usually taken in late autumn and early winter, when their pelts are of the highest quality and because the heavy snow makes it easier for the wolves to be tracked. Adult wolves are usually too fast to be overtaken by wolfhounds, but not for well conditioned horses, especially in thick snow. A shot wolf must be approached with caution, as some wolves will play possum. Accounts as to how wolves react to being trapped or cornered vary. John James Audubon wrote that young wolves typically show little resistance to being caught, whereas older, more experienced wolves will fight savagely.

=== Pelts ===
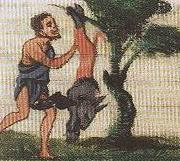
Parchment by Oppian of Apamea illustrating a wolf being skinned

Wolf pelt geographical variations- A Mackenzie Valley wolf, a Yukon wolf, a Yugoslavian wolf and a European wolf

Wolves are commonly hunted for their fur. The color of a wolf's fur can vary, from the pure white of the largest, Alaskan wolves, through the range of reddish brown. Even the so-called "grey wolves" can include pure black pups in a litter, although grey is the most common color. Wolves have two kinds of hairs; an outer coat of long, stiff hairs called "guard hairs" and an "undercoat" of soft fur which grows thick in the winter and helps to insulate their bodies from the cold; this fur has the advantage of not freezing. The five inches (130 mm) long guard hairs which are shed in spring and summer are waterproof, keeping the wolf's underfur dry and warm. The fur of the undercoat may be nearly two and a half inches thick and help keep a wolf warm even in temperatures reaching 40 degrees below zero. Wolves in warm climates have shorter guard hairs and less dense underfur. In some areas of medieval Europe, pelts were the only considered practicality of wolves. Pelts were usually made into cloaks or mittens, though not without hesitation, because of the wolf's strong odor.

Wolf pelts were important to many Native American tribes and considered by some to be powerful medicine. Sacred articles were wrapped in wolf skin and some tribes also wove wolf and American bison hair together in small blankets. Native American hunters used wolf pelts as disguises to allow them stalk close bison herds. The bison were accustomed to having wolves walk among them and did not fear wolves unless they were vulnerable because of disease, injury, or if guarding young. Wolf pelts were also valuable as clothing, objects for trade and for ruffs or coats. They were also used in ritual dances and worn by some shamans, or medicine men. Tundra-dwelling wolves are especially valued, as their pelages are more luxuriant than those of forest dwelling wolves, sometimes selling for twice as much. Females typically have smoother coats than males. Ethiopian wolves are not usually exploited for fur, though there was an occasion in Wollo in which wolf skins were used as saddle pads. In Russia, between the years 1600–1725, wolves were not actively sought out for their fur, which was not considered a major commodity, though they were taken when the opportunity presented itself. In the former Soviet Union, between 1976 and 1988, 30,000 wolf pelts were produced annually. Recent statistics from CITES indicate that 6,000–7,000 wolf skins are internationally traded each year, with Canada, the former Soviet Union, Mongolia and China being the largest exporters, and the United States and Great Britain being the largest importers. Today, wolf pelts are still valued for parka trim, fur coats and rugs. The production of wolf pelts is still an important source of income for Arctic communities in Alaska and Canada.

While not in the same class as high grade furbearers like beaver, otter or mink, the gray wolf's fur is nonetheless thick and durable, and is primarily used for scarfs and the trimmings of women's garments, though it is occasionally used for jackets, short capes, coats, mukluks and rugs. Aside from bodily protection and adornment, gray wolf pelts have also been used as camouflage in hunting and warfare, as an insignia among western Native Americans and as a form of currency. The quality of wolf peltries rests on the density and strength of the fur fibre, which keeps the fur upright and gives the pelt an appealing bushy aspect. These characteristics are mostly found in northern wolf populations, but gradually lessen further south in warmer climates. North American wolf pelts are among the most valuable, as they are silkier and fluffier than Eurasian peltries.

In Medieval Europe, pelts were considered the only practical aspect of wolves, though they were seldom used, because of the skin's foul odour. In Scandinavian folklore, wolf-skin girdles assisted in transforming the wearers into werewolves, while several Native American tribes used wolf pelts for medicinal purposes. Plains Indians often wore wolf pelts as disguises to get close to American bison when hunting. The Pawnee wore wolf skins as capes when exploring enemy territories. The United States Army used wolf skin for parkas during the later stages of World War II and the Korean War to protect the faces of soldiers from frostbite. In the Soviet Union, 30,000 wolf pelts were produced annually between 1976 and 1988. Statistics from CITES indicate that 6,000–7,000 wolf skins are internationally traded each year, with Canada, the former Soviet Union, Mongolia and China being the largest exporters, and the United States and Great Britain being the largest importers. Overall, the harvesting of wolves for their fur has little impact on their population, as only the northern varieties (whose numbers are stable) are of commercial value. Wolf trapping for fur remains a lucrative source of income for many Native Americans.

=== Ritual and traditional medicine ===
In Ancient Greece and Ancient Rome, wolf flesh was a main ingredient in unguents used to ward off evil. When applied in the form of a powder, the wolf unguent would be used to cure epilepsy, plague and gout. Powdered wolf bones were used to cure chest and back pains, broken bones and strained tendons. Wolf teeth, particularly the canines, would be perforated and used as talismans against evil spirits. This practice is thought to fall back to the Paleolithic, as shown by some prehistoric grave sites showing numerous wolf tooth charms. It continues in some areas of rural France, where it is also thought that wearing a wolf tooth offers protection from wolf attacks. The tongue, when cooked with flour and honey, was traditionally used as a remedy for epilepsy and as a guarantee of good luck. The eyes of a wolf were traditionally thought to give courage to children and render the user partially invisible. The liver was particularly prized for medicinal and ritualistic purposes. When cooked or desiccated into a powder and mixed with certain ingredients (flour, wine, water, blood, urine etc.), wolf liver was said to cure epilepsy, edema, tachycardia, syphilis, gangrene, vertigo, migraines, verucas and dysentery. Wolf penis supposedly cured impotence. Wolf blood was used for gout, period pains and deafness. The paws and fat of a wolf were sometimes used to ward off evil, or facilitate the transformation of a werewolf. Wolf dung was used against colics. The milk of a she-wolf made the drinker invulnerable, while eating the heart of a wolf gave the consumer courage in battle. A wolf's tail, while used for warding off evil, was also used as a love charm. The head of a wolf, if hung outside a house, would deter wolves, robbers and evil spirits. When reduced to powder, a wolf's head could be used against toothache and joint pains.

In the cultures of certain Native American tribes, wolf body parts were considered important additions to certain rituals. Pawnee warriors, known as Wolf People, dressed in wolf skin cloaks when scouting or hunting. Nez Perce warriors wore wolf teeth pushed through the septums of their noses. Cheyenne medicine men wrapped wolf fur on sacred arrows used to motion prey into traps. Arikara men wove wolf fur with bison fur in order to make small sacred blankets. Nuxálk mothers painted wolf gall bladders on their young male children's backs, so they could grow up to perform religious ceremonies without making mistakes as hunters. Hidatsan women experiencing difficult births would call upon the familial power of wolves by rubbing wolf-skin caps on their bellies. In Mongolian folk medicine, eating the intestines of a wolf is said to alleviate chronic indigestion, while sprinkling food with powdered wolf rectum is said to cure haemorroids. There are not many traditional uses for Ethiopian wolves, though their livers may be used for medicinal reasons in northern Ethiopia.

=== Meat ===
It is rare for wolves to be hunted for food, though historically, people have resorted to consuming wolf flesh in times of scarcity, or for medicinal reasons.

Most Native American tribes, especially the Naskapis, viewed wolf flesh as edible but inadequate nutrition, as it was not a herbivore and thus did not possess the same healing qualities thought to be distinct in plant eaters. The mountain people of Japan once ate wolf meat in order to boost their courage, though they commented that the meat was tough. Mountain dwelling wolves known as yomainu were considered poisonous. The derboun of the Arabian mountains and southern Syria was a small black wolf which apparently was considered by the Arabs to be more closely related to dogs, as they freely ate its flesh like any other game, unlike with regular wolves which had an unpleasant odour. During the European colonization of Western America, wolf meat was considered "not usually eatable", though fair game for a hungry man. However, Martin Schmitt argued that references to the consumption of wolf meat at the time may have actually been on coyotes. During Vilhjalmur Stefansson's Arctic expedition in 1913, George H. Wilkins sampled cooked wolf meat and commented that it was "fine eating" and noted a resemblance to chicken. There have been reports of parasites in the meat. Wolf meat is considered haram under Islamic dietary laws (Sahih Muslim, no: 1934)

In an 1868 issue of The Sant Paul's Magazine, Anthony Trollope gave an account on the palatability of wolf flesh, and how it was sometimes used as the subject of practical jokes among French hunters.

The flesh of the wolf may be taken certainly to be about the rankest carrion in creation, not even excepting that of the common vulture and the turkey-buzzard. Yet all this in reality is less fact than imagination. M. Charles Gauthey, a well-known sportsman in the Cote-d'Or, relates that the landlord of a country inn, himself a sportsman, and wishing to play the brethren a confraternal trick—or as it is called in French, leur jouer un tour de chasseur,—had a piece of wolf's flesh cut into small square morsels, and stewed up with veal and mutton cut into pieces of a different shape. The landlord helped the ragout himself, and being careful to serve each guest with one of the square morsels, was enabled to inform them after dinner that they had all been eating wolf. Two of the guests were thereupon seized with horror, and one to such a degree that he was compelled to retire from the table with precipitation. The others took the joke in good part, and one and all declared they had detected nothing in the dish to excite suspicion in the least degree.

— The Saint Pauls Magazine, by Anthony Trollope. Published by Virtue and Co., 1868

Wolf meat was eaten several times during Vilhjalmur Stefansson's 1913 Arctic expedition, particularly during the summer, when wolves were fat. Natives in Transbaikalia reportedly ate wolf meat even when other food was plentiful. The consumption of wolf flesh and organs plays an important role in Asian folk medicine: in Mongolia, eating the meat and lungs of a wolf is said to alleviate colds, and sprinkling food with powdered wolf rectum is said to cure haemorroids. Accounts on how wolf meat tastes vary greatly, with descriptions ranging from "tough", "gristly", "distasteful" and "smelly", to "somewhat [resembling] chicken", and "very superior to lean venison".

A total of 112 different exotic species, including wolf meat, are sold in addition to seafood at the Huanan Seafood Market in China.

== Terminology ==
Wolf hunting historically gave rise to a vast vocabulary:

- Berkut: A tame golden eagle used to hunt wolves in Central Asia.
- Grand vieux loup: An old, solitary male wolf.
- Loup Chevalier: A wolf which regularly attacks horses.
- Loup lévrier: A wolf exceptionally fast in the chase.
- Loup Moutonnier: A wolf which regularly attacks sheep.
- Louve: A female wolf.
- La Louveterie: Wolf hunting.
- Louvetier royal: Modern day offshoot of the luparii. Now serves an administrative function regulating vermin and maintaining healthy wildlife populations.
- Lovière: A wolf den.
- Luparii: An elite corps of crown funded officials whose purpose was to control wolf populations in France during the Middle Ages.
- Lycisca: A wolf-dog hybrid.
- Outlaw wolf: A wolf which regularly killed livestock in America.
- Wolfer: Both professional and civilian wolf hunters who operated in North America in the 19th and early 20th centuries.
- Wolfhound: A dog bred or trained to hunt wolves.

== Methods ==
=== Aerial shooting ===
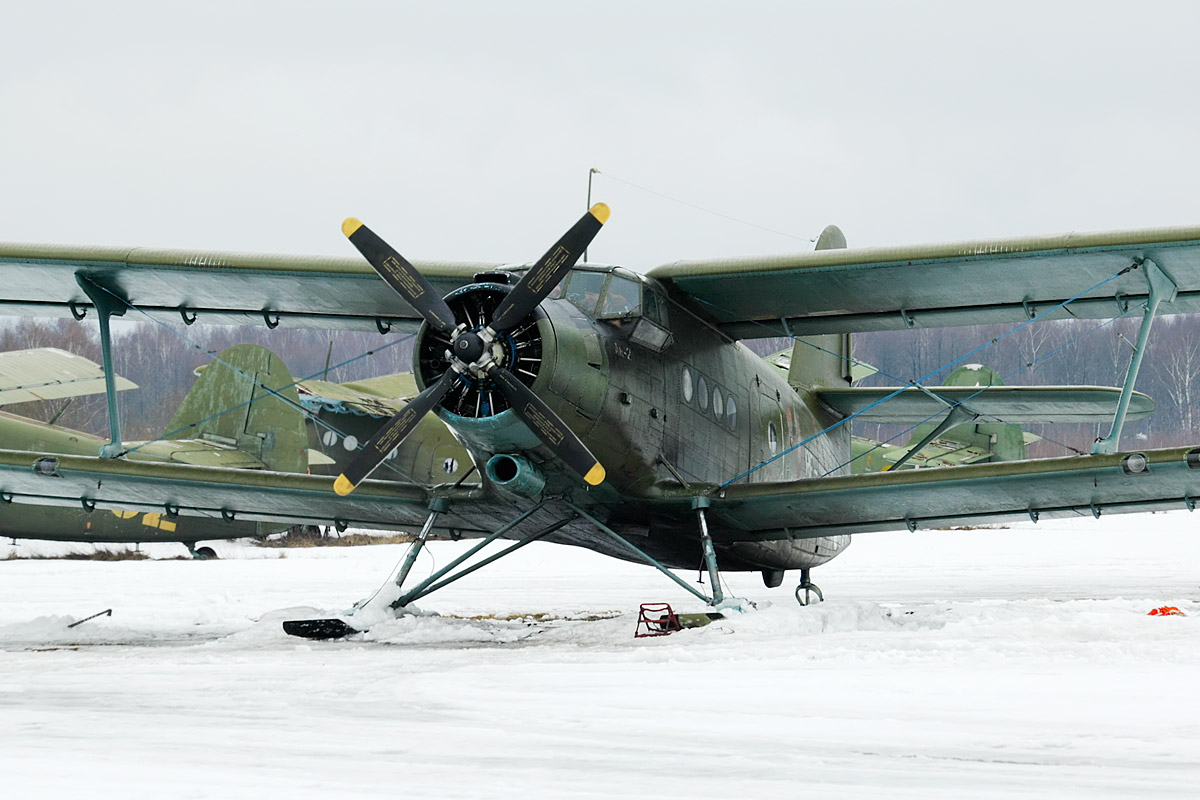
An-2 on skis at Volosovo air field, Moscow. It was one of the most frequently used models in the USSR's wolf management programmes.

Aerial shooting involves the tracking of wolves via a small airplane or helicopter and is considered by many to be the most effective method of wolf control. It was frequently used in the Soviet Union during its wolf control campaigns, starting in 1946 when the Chief Directorate of Aviation received reports that pilots flying at low altitudes frequently saw wolves. Polikarpov Po-2s and Antonov An-2s were the most frequently used models. The normal protocol was for the pilot to search frontally, and the shooter sideways. 70%–80% of wolves were first sighted by the pilot. Rocket guns would be fired into dense brush in order to scare wolves out into the open. Markers were thrown at the site of each kill for later collection. Actual shooting was done from the rear cockpit or left side when at a distance of 18–20 metres from the quarry. An experienced shooter could spot a standing wolf a kilometre away at heights of up to 100–140 metres. Most wolves were killed when the planes flew at speeds of 70 to 85 km/h. The load limit of a Po-2 was two men and five adult wolves; the rear cockpit could hold four wolves, while the shooter's cockpit could hold two, or carcasses could be tied to the fuselage or wings of the plane. Aerial hunting has been discontinued in the former Soviet Union because of budget restraints. Wolf hunting is still practiced this way in the U.S. state of Alaska. "Congress passed the Federal Airborne Hunting Act of 1972, which made it illegal for hunters to shoot animals from a plane or helicopter. The federal legislation does have a provision for predator control, permitting state employees or licensed individuals to shoot from an aircraft for the sake of protecting "land, water, wildlife, livestock, domesticated animals, human life, or crops".

=== Blind ===
The use of heated box blinds is a popular method of wolf hunting in modern Alberta. Bait stations are set in advance of the hunt, with blinds being erected in the more frequented spots. The method was developed as a response to the fact that finding wolves on foot was almost always a pure luck scenario, because of the wolf's elusiveness. Shots are usually fired when the wolf is 200 yards (180 m) from the blind.

=== Calling ===
Calling is a traditional wolf hunting method of Mongolia. The hunters go to the place where the pack is located early in the morning and will imitate a wolf's howl. The hunters howl in unison with the wolves and wait for the animals to come to them. Mongolian wolf hunting is usually done with the assistance of local herders.

=== Fladry ===
In modern European Russia, a traditional wolf hunting method involves encircling the located wolf pack with a 3–5 kilometers (1.9–3.1 miles) fladry, a long rope with small swatches of fabric stitched to it every few feet. The fabric is usually red in order to be easier spotted over the background of snow by the guides. Since it retains a human scent for several days, wolves tend to stay within the encircled area. When the hunters arrive, the pack of wolves is already "flagged".

=== Hunting with dogs ===
Several dog breeds known as wolfhounds have been bred for the purpose of hunting wolves, though conventional hunting breeds have also been used.

=== Hunting with eagles ===
The use of raptors in the hunting of wolves is primarily practised in Central Asia. The Kyrgyz people have traditionally used golden eagles, known as berkut, to hunt wolves. In the past, wolf pelts provided material for clothes crucial for the survival of the nomadic people in the severe colds. The eagles are used to immobilize the wolves by placing one foot at the back of the neck and another at the flank closer to the heart and lungs. Hunters usually only use eagles against pups, as an adult wolf can cripple in combat even a highly experienced eagle. Losing even one toe or talon will significantly lower the eagle's ability to tackle prey. Only a minor injury to the sinew of a foot may leave the eagle incapable of further hunting. As a wolf is capable of resisting even the best-trained bird, the falconer always keeps near, ready at the first opportunity to help the eagle. This is done carefully, as the wolf, sensing human presence, fights desperately to tear loose from the bird's talons, and the eagle can be severely injured. Because of the violent nature of their work, eagles trained to hunt wolves have shorter life spans.

=== Luring ===
In 19th century Russia and Scandinavia, pigs were used as decoys and were transported in strong canvas sacks on horse-drawn sleighs. The pigs, kept in the canvas bags, were made to squeal in order to attract the wolves. Hunters would wait at a distance to shoot the wolves when they came out after the pig. Once the wolves arrived, the hunters would either shoot them or retrieve the pig and canvas bag. In the latter case, they took off down the road, luring the wolves behind. The wolves would be led to a palisade, where they would be trapped and shot.

=== Poisoning ===
Historically, poisoning was very successful in reducing wolf populations, particularly in the American West and Imperial Japan. Strychnine was the most frequently used compound. The poison would be typically mixed in lard or tallow, and spread on bits of meat, or placed within incisions on the bait. Though effective, the method had the disadvantage of greatly loosening the fur of the dead wolf, causing it to shed easily. Wolves killed by strychnine were typically skinned immediately after death, in order to avoid the fur absorbing too much of the poison.

Strychnine is a poisonous ingredient included in a variety of pesticides and is used as a grain baits most of the time. The strychnine was used to kill wolves and became one of the most effective methods for protecting livestock and also eradicating pests that threaten the environment. Pesticides containing strychnine are lethal to everything that consumes them. But since this sort of poison caused pain and brutal death for the animals who swallowed it strychnine baits, capable of killing wolves, were banned in 1972 by the US government and in 2006 by the European Union. In 2019, a Montana resident illegally used strychnine bait by placing the poison into cow meat in order to poison a wolf. The consequence of this unlawful behavior, according to U.S. Magistrate Judge Kathleen L. DeSoto, was the death of not just a wolf, but also resulted in additional collateral deaths of a pet dog and other small animals. The individual was fined $500 and ordered to pay $1,000 in restitution to the Montana Department of Fish, Wildlife, and Parks.

=== Skidor ===
In Lapland, wolves were occasionally hunted by the Sámi on skis. They would be armed with stout, 6-foot-long (1.8 m) poles tipped with a pike which was used both as propulsion and as a weapon. A skidor hunt was usually undertaken by multiple hunters over a course of a few days. The kill itself was usually made at a slope or hillside.

=== Traps ===
==== Knife and hook traps ====
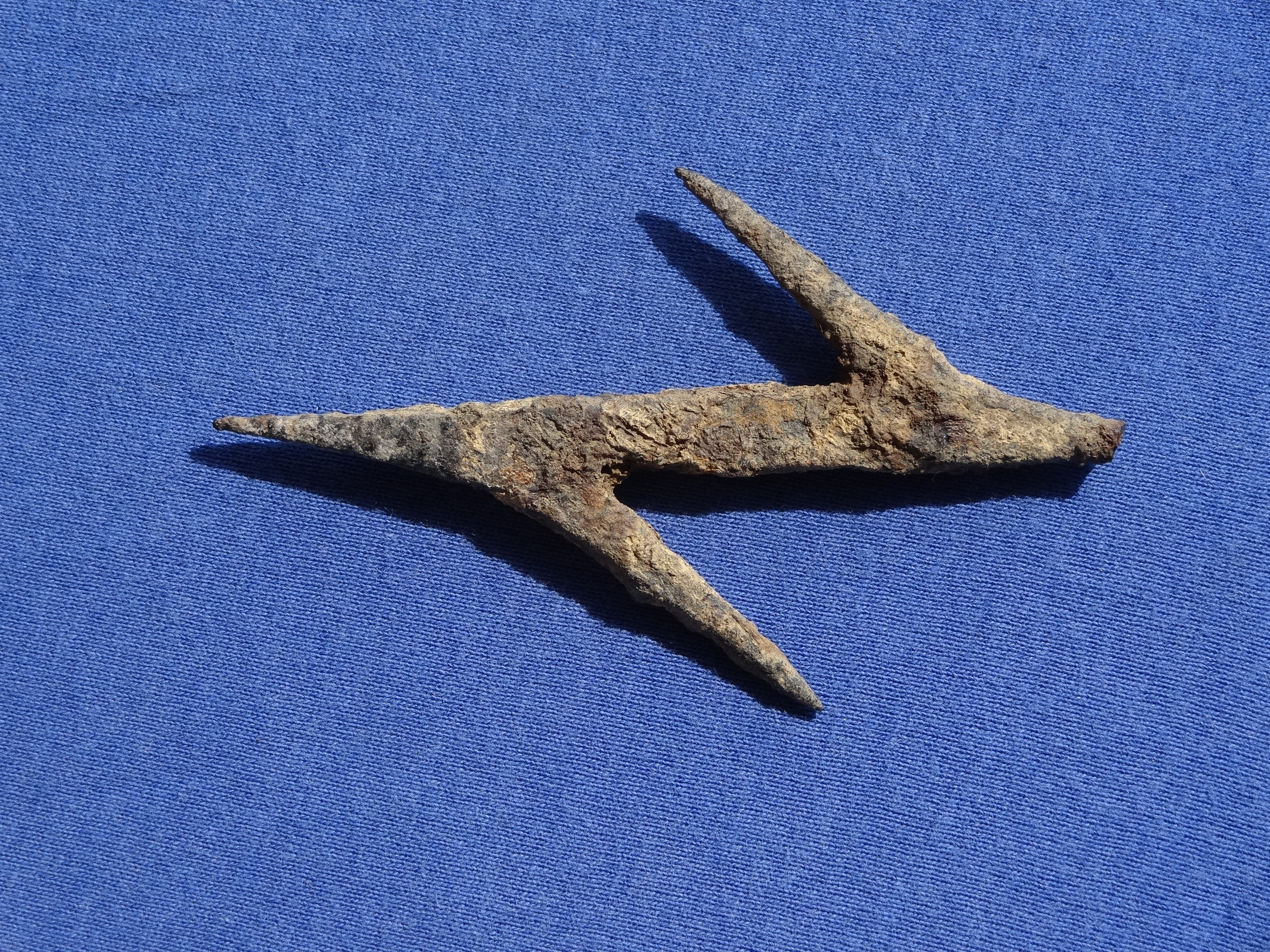
8th century Wolfsangel from the Carolingian Villa Arnesburg in Lich

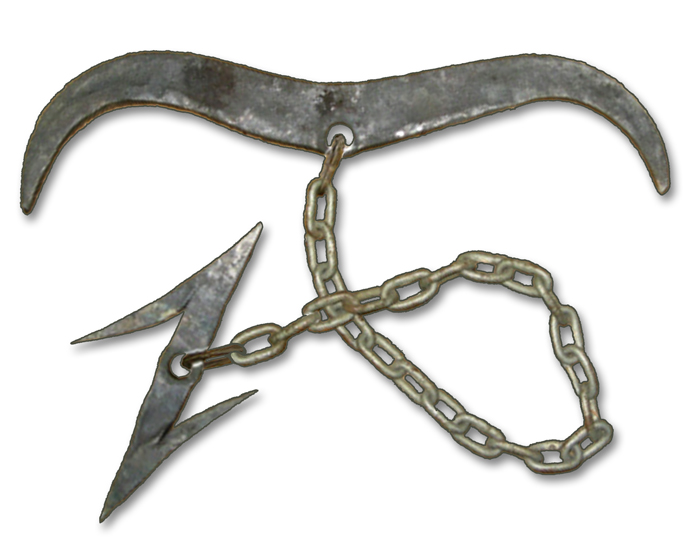
Wolfsangel with wolf hook (Z) chained to a wolf anchor (crescent bar)

The Native Americans used two kinds of knife traps. One method was to encase a sharp blade in fat and frozen upright on a block of ice. The wolf would cut itself while licking the blade and bleed to death. Some argue that this method is a myth. The other method was a baited torsion spring which when triggered, would stab the wolf in the head.

In medieval Germany and eastern France, an iron Wolfsangel ("wolf hook") was used to bait the wolf in the manner of catching a fish.

==== Trapping pit ====
Across the top of the trapping pit was a thick stick or pole, and on this was fastened a plank, which covered the top of the trap. On one end of this plank was a piece of venison, and on the other a stone. The way the trap was meant to work was this: The wolf would come to the venison, and just as it got on the plank to eat it, the plank would turn, causing the wolf to fall into the pit. The weight of the stone at the other end would bring the plank up again, ready baited for another wolf.

==== Steel wolf trap ====
Steel wolf traps, used frequently in the American west, were made from heavy steel, were six and a half inches wide, and had two springs, each with 100 lbs of power. Steel wolf traps were usually the same models used in the capture of beavers, lynx and wolverine. In order to hide the human scent, trappers would handle their equipment with gloves, and cover the traps in beeswax or blood. As the wolf's power of scent is so great, a mere touch of human skin on the trap will result in the wolf vacating the area. Wolves may also dig up or spring the traps. The traps would typically be set in fours around a bait and strongly fastened to concealed logs, and covered in moss, chaff, cotton or sand for camouflage. Sometimes, the trap and the bait would be placed in a pool of water, thus leaving no other point of access for the wolf to take.

== Reactions ==
=== Livestock and crop damage ===
Opponents have argued that at least in North America, wolves contribute little to overall livestock losses. In 2005, 0.11% of all cattle losses were due to wolves. In states with wolf populations, they were responsible for an average of 2.5% of predation on sheep. Jim Dutcher, a filmmaker who raised a captive wolf pack, observed that the wolves were very reluctant to try meat that they had not previously eaten or seen another wolf eat before, possibly explaining why livestock depredation is unlikely except in cases of desperation. In Wyoming, Idaho and Montana, wolf predation accounts for 1% of total sheep deaths.

Wolf hunting proponents have drawn attention to the fact that wolves will on occasion commit acts of surplus killing when within the confines of human-made livestock shelters. Rare incidents of surplus killing by wolves in Minnesota are reported to leave up to 35 sheep killed and injured in flocks and losses of 50 to 200 birds in turkey flocks. In spite of the low percentage of attacks on livestock in Minnesota, farms in wolf territories and environments may become more susceptible to depredation under certain conditions. These conditions include larger farm size, increased numbers of cattle, an increased distance from human management, and improper disposal of livestock carcasses. While loss of livestock by wolves makes up only a small percentage of total losses in North America, surveys in Eurasia show some instances where wolf predation was frequent. In some areas of the former Soviet Union, wolves cause serious damage to watermelon plantations. Wolves will usually only take ripe melons after giving test bites, which can render even unripe fruits worthless for future consumption. Sometimes, up to 20% of the total watermelon crop can be destroyed on one raid.

=== Wolves and game herds ===
Wolf hunting opponents have argued that wolves serve vital functions in areas where they are sympatric with game herds. By culling unhealthy animals, wolves keep game herds healthy. Opponents state that without wolves, prey populations swell unnaturally, unbalancing ecosystems whilst simultaneously sapping wildlife management resources. In the Iberian Peninsula for example, conservationists consider wolves to be beneficial because they keep wild boar populations stable, thus allowing some respite to the endangered capercaillie populations which suffer greatly from boars eating the eggs and nestlings. In Yellowstone National Park, wolves were shown to have a hugely positive effect on general ecological health, and by extension, that of game herds. Game animals in Yellowstone killed off all young, reachable tree saplings, destroying beaver, songbird, insect, fish and amphibian populations, and threatening to starve themselves via overexploitation. Wolves reduced game animal numbers and forced them to be more mobile, allowing more saplings to grow and allowing the populations of aforementioned animals to increase.

Proponents for wolf hunting often point out the apparently adverse effects large wolf populations have on game herds. An example occurred in 2008, in which the Alaska Board of Game approved plans calling for department staff to shoot wolves from helicopters on the southern Alaska Peninsula in order to assist the survival of the Southern Alaska Peninsula Caribou Herd. Wolves were believed to be responsible for a dramatic drop in the Southern Alaska Caribou Herd's population, which once numbered up to 10,000 in 1983, only to drop to a population of 600 animals in 2008. Wolf predation was also believed to be responsible for virtually no calves surviving for the two years prior the culling plans, despite a 70% pregnancy rate.

In the former Soviet Union, depending on the locality, a single wolf can consume 90 saiga, 50–80 wild boar or an average of 50 domestic or wild caribou annually. A pack of 2–5 wolves will often kill two caribou every three days. Further reports from the former Soviet Union indicate that rather than prey on exclusively sick or infirm prey, wolves seem to attack young or pregnant animals far more frequently, regardless of their sanitary state. In the Nenetskij National Okrug, wolves were shown to select pregnant female domestic caribou and calves rather than infirm specimens, with some reports showing that wolves bypassed emaciated, sickly animals in favour of well fed ones. Large numbers of wolves have also been blamed on the decline of critically endangered saiga antelope herds in Central Asia. During the late 1950s and early 1960s when the Soviet Union used poison to effectively bring down wolf numbers, the number, as well as the range of moose, wild boar and red deer increased. Caspian seals were valued as fur bearers in the Soviet industry, and in a three-week period in February 1978, wolves were responsible for the wanton killing of numerous seals on the Caspian Sea near Astrakhan. Between 17 and 40% of the seals in the area were estimated to have been killed, but not eaten.

=== Wolves and the spread of disease ===
Some hunt proponents argue that large numbers of wolves are central to the spread of numerous infectious diseases because of their nomadic nature. Diseases recorded to be carried by wolves include rabies, brucella, deerfly fever, listeriosis, foot and mouth disease and anthrax. Wolves are major hosts for rabies in Russia, Iran, Afghanistan, Iraq and India. Wolves in Russia have been recorded to carry over 50 kinds of harmful parasites. A 10-year study in the former Soviet Union showed that in some regions, every successful wolf litter in spring coincided with a 100% increase in cestode infections in moose and wild boar, with some specimens having up to 30–40 cysts. It also showed that where wolves were absent, the number of cysticercosis-infected wild ungulates was much less. Although they by habit carry harmful diseases, large wolf populations are not negatively influenced by epizootic outbreaks as with other canids, and thus some hunting proponents argue that disease cannot be a guarantee of naturally controlling wolf numbers.

A 14-year study in Spain showed that wolf predation reduced the prevalence of tuberculosis in wild boar without reducing the population density of wild boar; reduced mortality rate from infection compensated for the mortality rate from predation. Mathematical models suggest that in comparison to deer culls, wolf predation is significantly more effective at reducing the rate of chronic wasting disease (CWD) in deer, while also having less impact on deer population size.

=== Attacks on humans ===
The absence of a global review, and the language barrier having partially hindered the flow of international information has led some international groups to level criticism at some wolf advocates, claiming that they have extrapolated America's general lack of negative experiences with wolves to the rest of the world, whilst ignoring the differing histories and cultures which lead to diverse interactions with the animals. Hunting proponents argue that wolves with no negative experiences of humans are more likely to encroach upon human settlements and attack people, citing for example the differences in attitudes toward the public distribution of firearms in America and Eurasia as examples as to why nations on both continents have differing accounts of wolf aggression. Hunting wolves is reasoned to maintain shyness in wolves, an idea which is correlated by a modern account demonstrating that wolves in protected areas are more likely to show no fear toward humans than ones in areas where they are actively hunted. Historical and recent accounts indicate that habituated or "fearless" individual wolves or wolf packs must be met with measures to dissociate wolves' association between and dependence on humans for food to mitigate risk for attack.

== Notable wolf hunters ==
- Antoine de Beauterne
- Jean Chastel
- MacQueen of Pall à Chrocain
- Mary, Queen of Scots
- Jack O'Connor
- Theodore Roosevelt
- Ernest Thompson Seton
- Ivan IV Vasilyevich

== Gallery ==
Wolf hunt depicted in a 14th-century bestiary

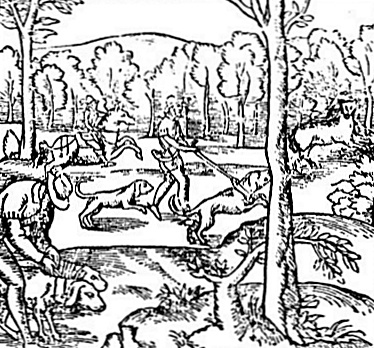
Wolf hunt with hounds, 15th-century engraving (wolf in upper right)

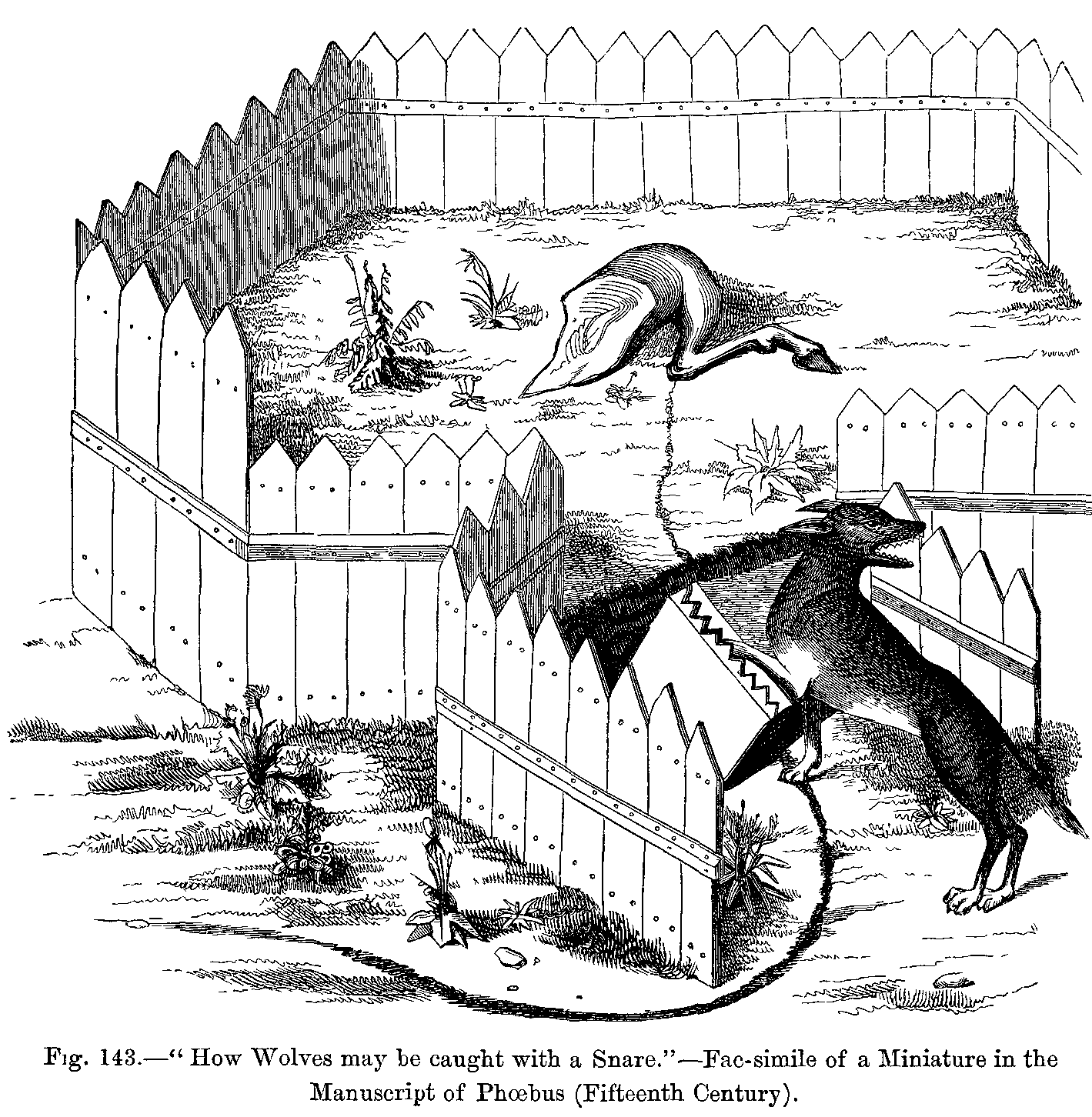
15th-century paper instructing on how to trap wolves with snares

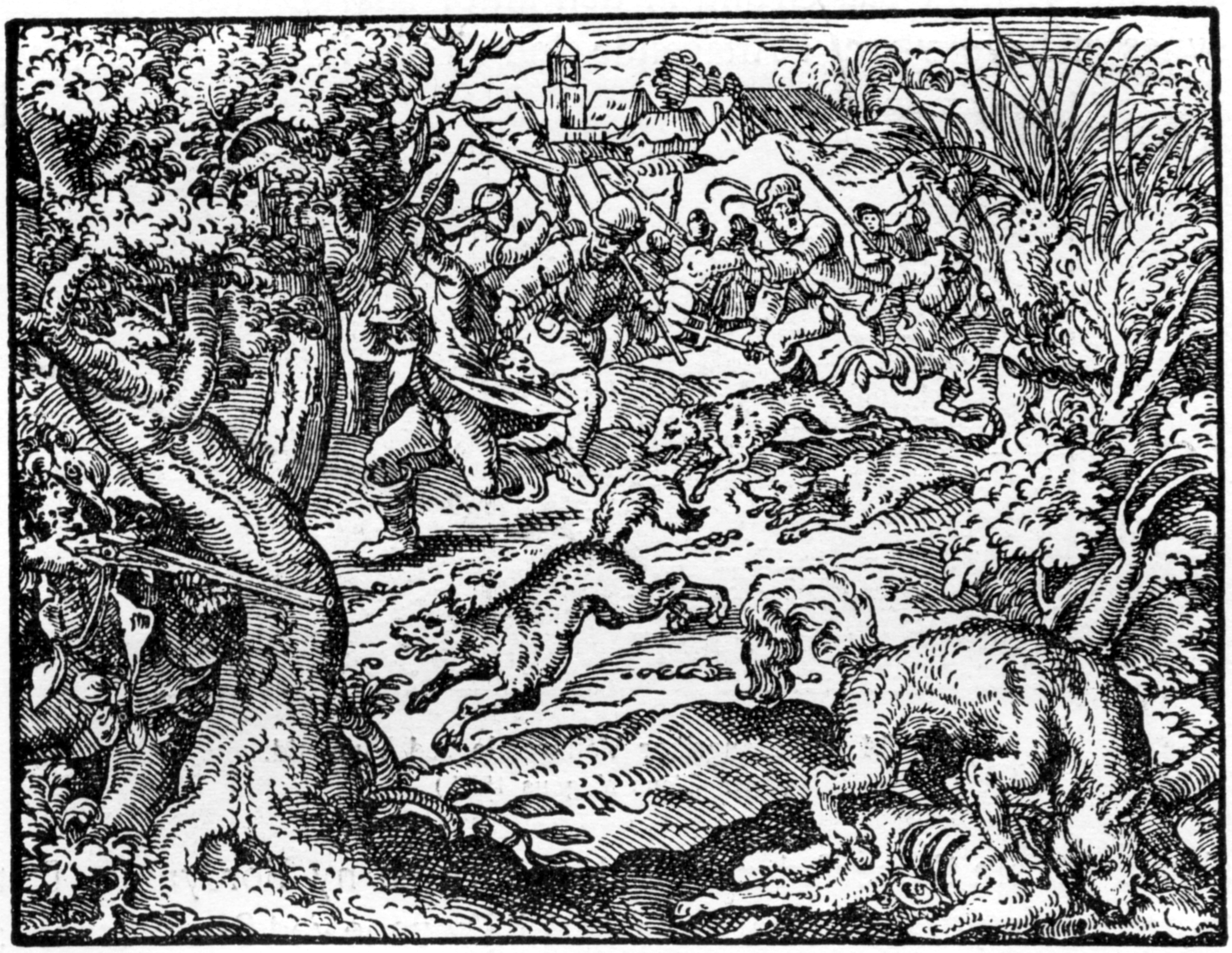
Drawing of a wolf hunt from Neuw Jag vnnd Weyderwerck Buch, Frankfurt am Main 1582

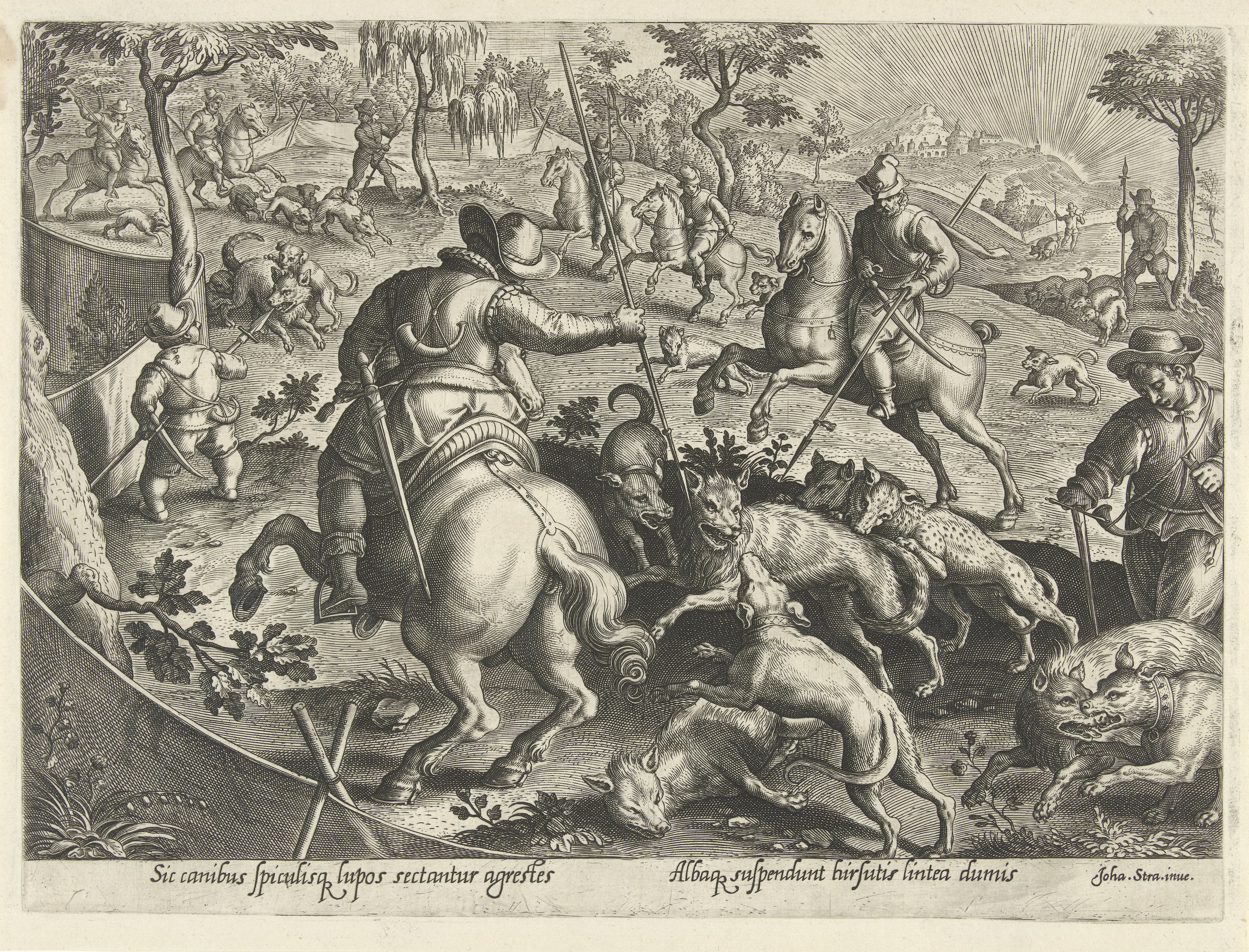
A 16th-century print after Stradanus depicting a wolf hunt

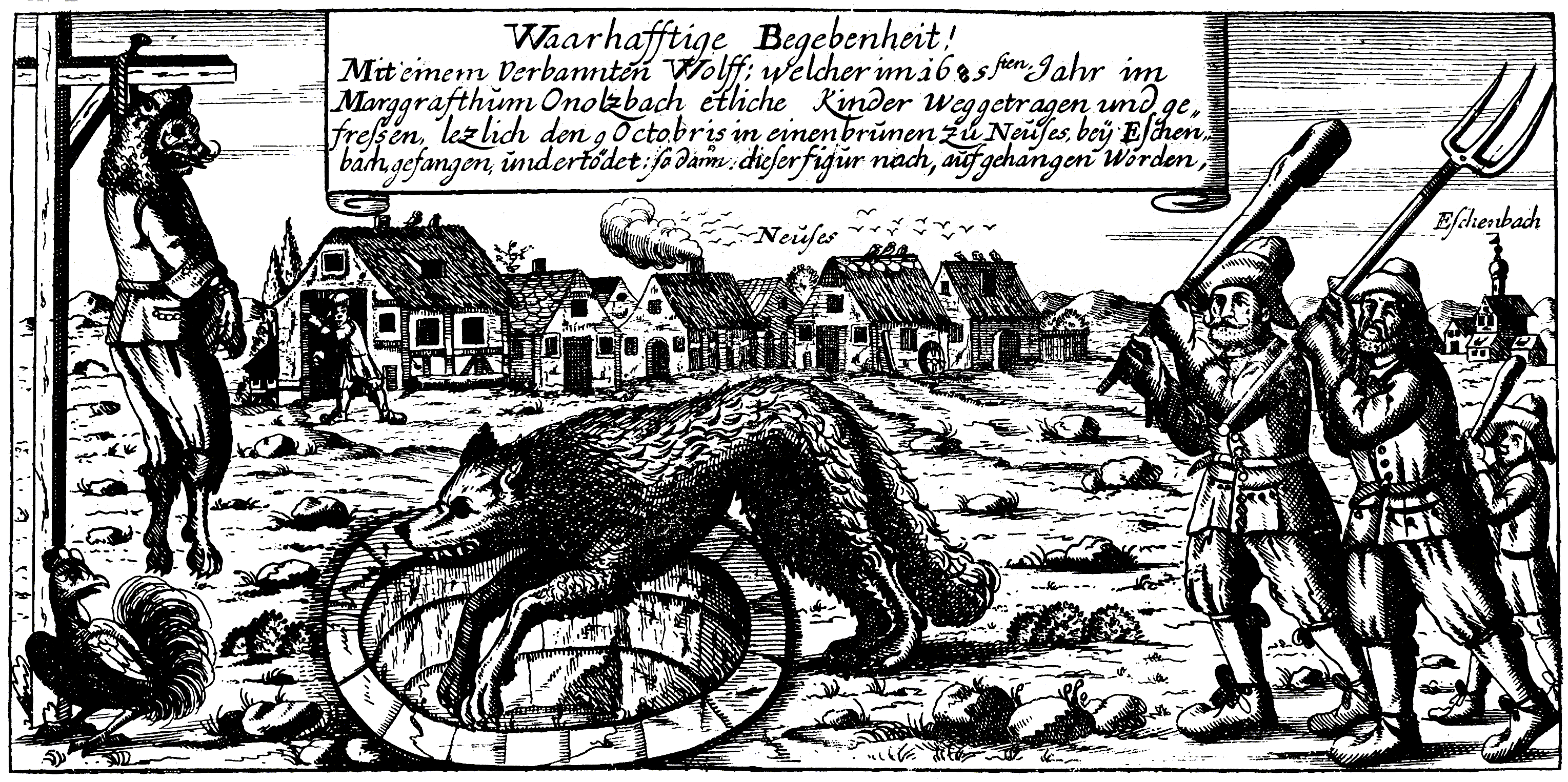
The Wolf of Ansbach, chased into a well and displayed on a gibbet

Wolf and Fox Hunt by Peter Paul Rubens

Wolf hunt by Jean-Baptiste Oudry

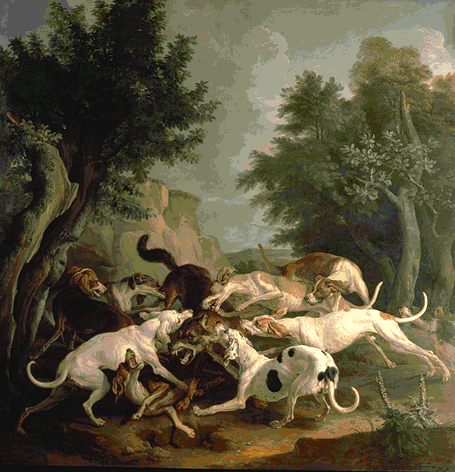
The Wolf Hunt, Alexandre-François Desportes

A 19th-century painting depicting the conclusion of a wolf hunt

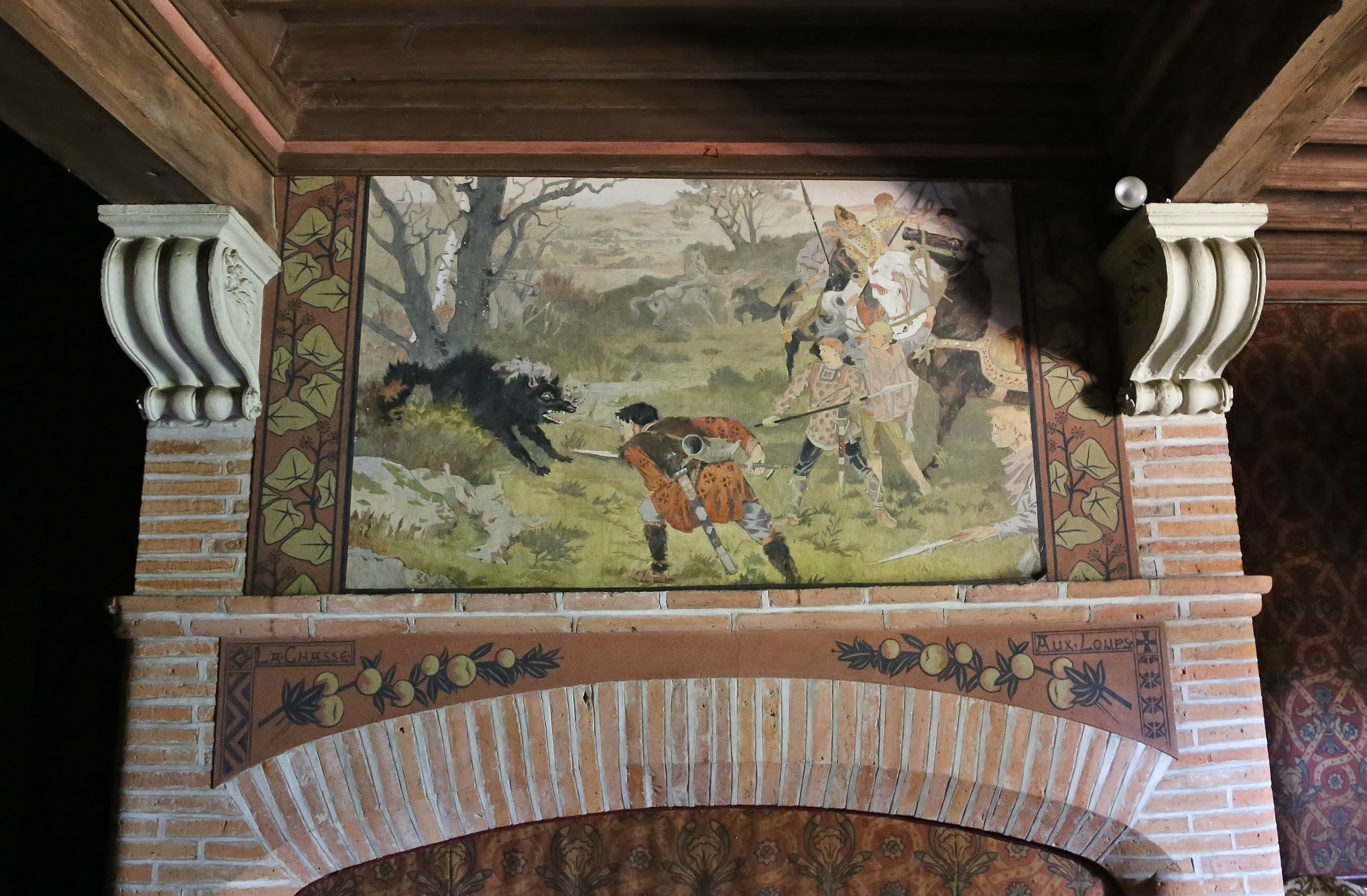
Fireplace decoration depicting a wolf hunt in the castle of Pibrac (France)

== See also ==
- Wolf reintroduction
- Animal welfare
- Beast of Gévaudan, a famous episode of wolf-hunting
- Hunting license
- Jackal coursing
- Three Toes of Harding County famous wolf hunted in South Dakota
- Wolf attacks on humans, some of which have spurred hunts
- Wolf-baiting
- Wolf hunting with dogs

== Bibliography ==
- Lopez, Barry Holstun (1978). Of wolves and men. Scribner. ISBN 978-0-7432-4936-2.
- Mech, L. David; Boitani, Luigi (2003). Wolves: Behaviour, Ecology and Conservation. University of Chicago Press. ISBN 978-0-226-51696-7.
- Walker, Brett L. (2005). The Lost Wolves Of Japan. University of Washington Press. ISBN 978-0-295-98492-6.
- Young, Stanley P.; Goldman, Edward A. (1944). The Wolves of North America, Part I. New York, Dover Publications.
