= Black wolf =

Melanistic wolf

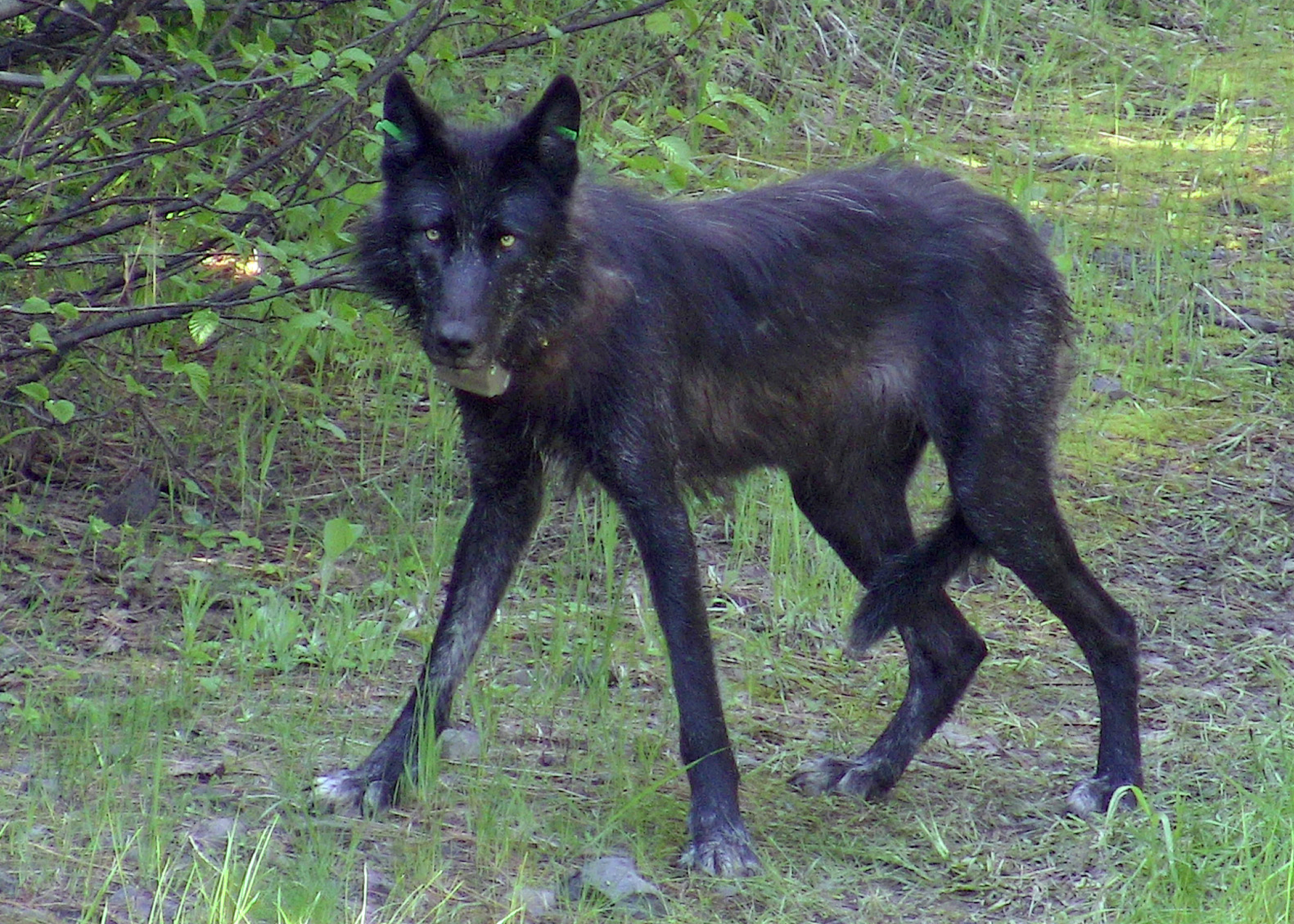
A black wolf with radio-collar in Oregon, United States

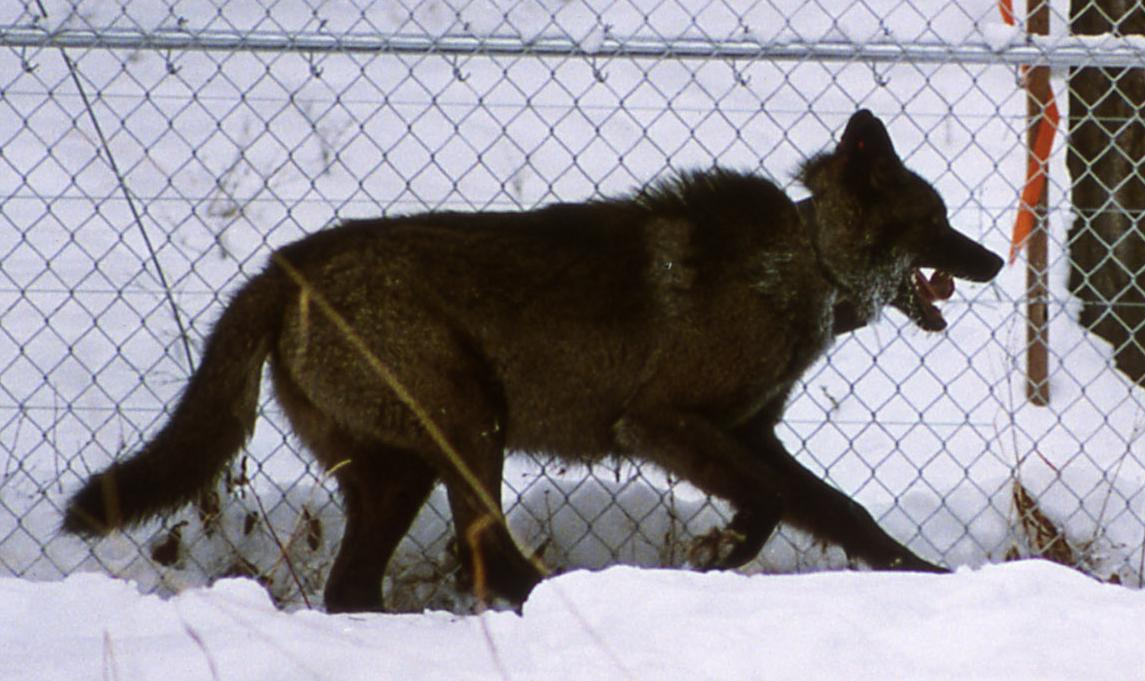
Genetic research has shown that black-furred wolves owe their coloration to a mutation that first arose in domestic dogs. (photo taken in Yellowstone National Park)

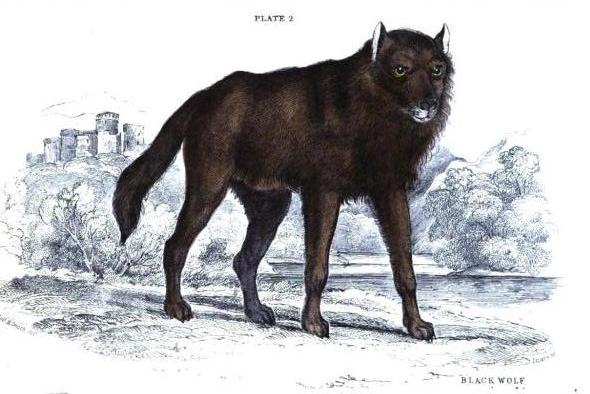
Illustration of a "European black wolf" by Charles Hamilton Smith

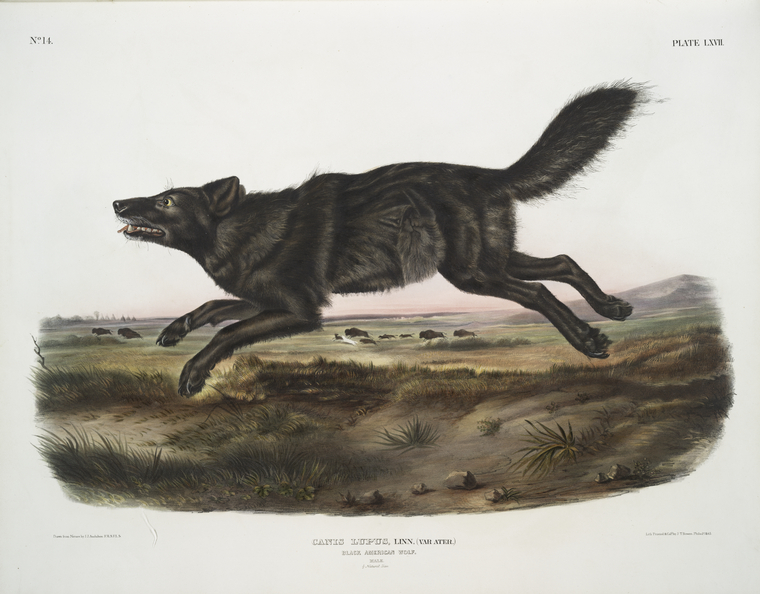
An illustration of an "American black wolf" by John James Audubon

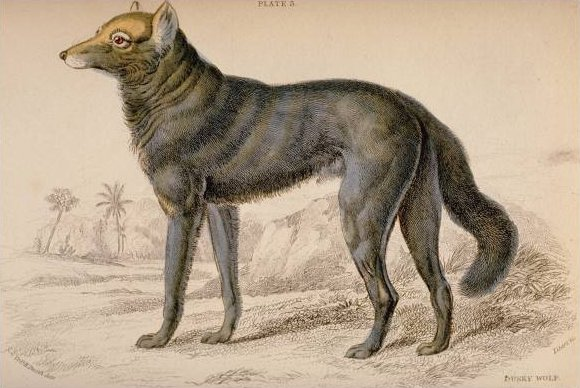
An engraving of a "dusky wolf", an animal once considered a separate species from northern black wolves

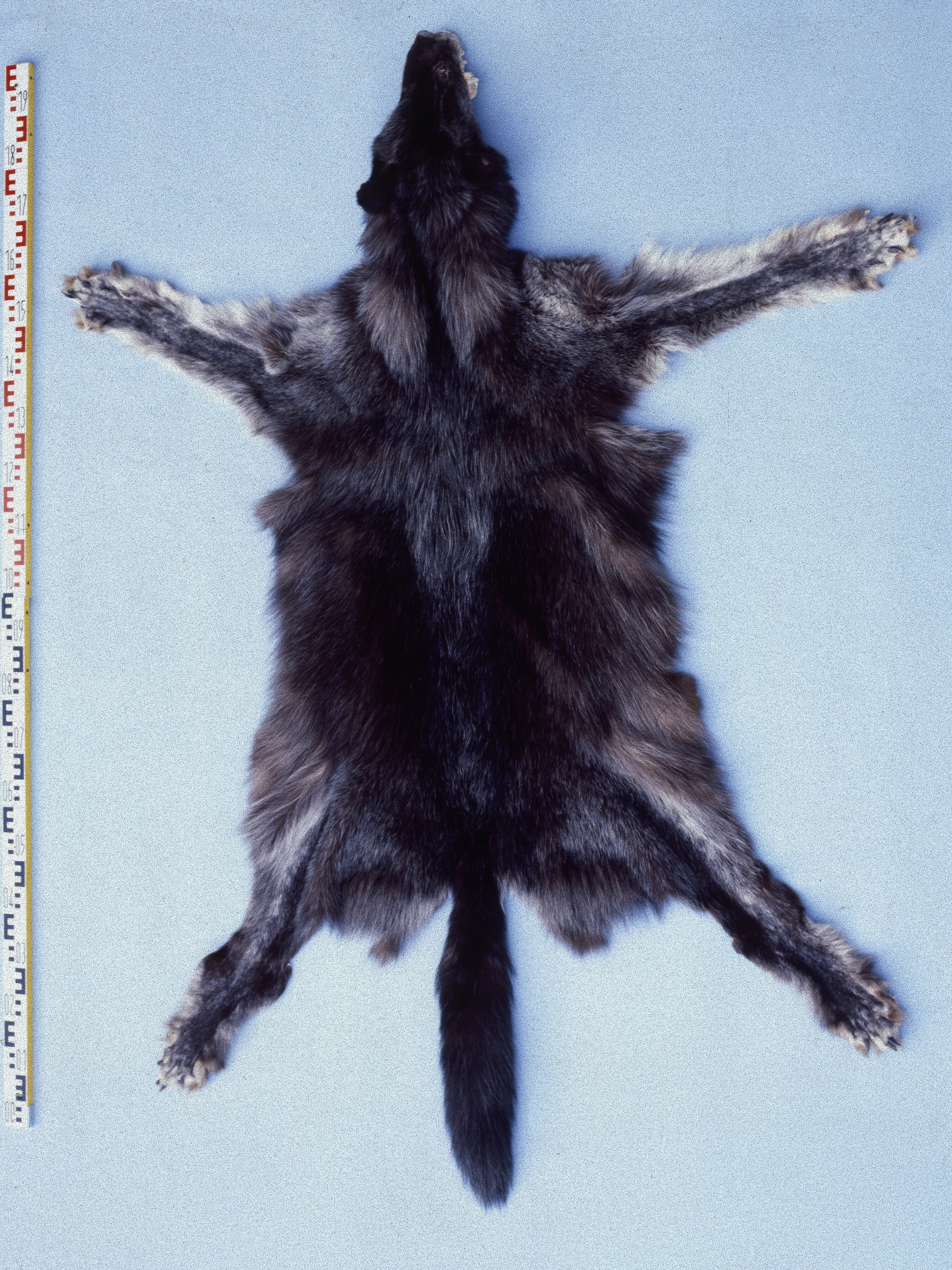
Skin of a black-coloured wolf taken from the Mackenzie Valley. The function of the black pigment is largely unknown.

A black wolf is a melanistic colour variant of the gray wolf (Canis lupus). Black specimens were recorded among red wolves (Canis rufus), though the colour phase in this species is now extinct. Genetic research from the Stanford University School of Medicine and the University of California, Los Angeles revealed that wolves with black pelts owe their distinctive coloration to a mutation which occurred in domestic dogs, and was carried to wolves through wolf-dog hybridization. Besides coat and knee colour, they are normal grey wolves.

== Early encounters and speculation ==
=== Europe ===
Linnaeus gave the black wolves of Europe the binomial name Canis lycaon, under the assumption that the species was distinct from grey- and white-coloured wolves. Cuvier and other naturalists largely followed his example. Black wolves were considered rare in France, but common in Southern Europe at the time, with black wolf populations south to the Pyrenees apparently outnumbering other colour phases. They also occurred in the mountains of Friuli (Italy) and around Kotor (Montenegro). Black wolves were also reported in Siberia as the Vekvoturian Mountain-wolf. Colonel Smith erroneously believed that the so-called "Rossomak" of the Lenas in Siberia was of the same variety. However, in fact, "Rossomak" in Russian exactly corresponds with the English "wolverine", a mustelid species, in English (Gulo gulo in Latin). Black wolves were considered rare in northern Europe; however, Dr. Höggberg, a medical practitioner at Karlstad mentioned five black wolves being killed in the Swedish province of Värmland in 1801. These wolves were completely black and were bigger than the more common grey variety. Their pelts were considered exotic enough to be sold for three to four times the price established for more common colour phases. Also, the last wolf in Scotland, supposedly killed by MacQueen of Pall à Chrocain, is usually narrated as having been black. Cuvier noted that European black wolves differed little in size from other colour phases, but exceeded them in physical strength. Charles Hamilton Smith wrote that black wolves were generally less aggressive than ordinary kinds, and interbred with dogs more readily. In Serbia (Southeastern Europe, the Balkan Peninsula) indicated that on 17 November 2012, a black wolf was killed at Stara Mountain. In Poland in February 2025, two black wolves, likely siblings, were caught on camera set up by SAVE Wildlife Conservation Fund crossing the forest river in northern Świętokrzyskie Voivodeship.

=== Asia ===
Black wolves were occasionally reported in Asia. The "Derboun" of the Arabian mountains and southern Syria was a small black wolf which apparently was considered by the Arabs to be more closely related to dogs, as they freely ate its flesh like any other game, unlike with regular wolves which had an unpleasant odour. Black wolves in Tibet are known locally as chanko nagpo, and are considered bolder and more aggressive than the pale-coloured variety. Small populations inhabit Ladakh.

=== North America ===
Although the black wolves of America were originally given the same binomial name as those in Europe, Anselme Gaëtan Desmarest believed that they were a different species. Historically, the natives of the banks of the Mackenzie River, Saskatchewan River and southern Canada apparently never viewed black wolves as a distinct species. In his 1791 book Travels, William Bartram mentioned seeing black wolves among the few red wolf populations he saw in Florida. He stated that they were "perfectly black", except the females which were described as having a white spot on the breast. Bartram also described a "black wolf-dog of the Florida Indians" which was identical to the local wolves, save for the fact that it could bark, and could be trusted around horses. The fur of a black wolf was once considered by the natives of New England to be worth over 40 beaver skins. A chieftain accepting a gift of black wolf fur was seen as an act of reconciliation. The black wolves of the Southern United States were considered a separate species to the northern kind due to differences in colour and morphology, and were named dusky or clouded wolves (Canis nubilus). The dusky wolves occurred in the Missouri Territory, and were intermediate in size between common wolves and coyotes. They apparently produced a foul odour. On January 15, 2009, a male black wolf from "Mollie's Pack" in the Yellowstone National Park's Pelican Valley was weighed in at 143 lbs, making it the largest Yellowstone wolf on record.

Adolph Murie was among the first wolf biologists to speculate that the wide color variation in wolves was due to interbreeding with dogs;

I suppose that some of the variability exhibited in these wolves could have resulted from crossings in the wild with dogs. Such crosses in the wild have been reported and the wolf in captivity crosses readily with dogs. Some years ago at Circle, Alaska, a wolf hung around the settlement for some time and some of the dogs were seen with it. The people thought that the wolf was a female attracted to the dogs during the breeding period. However, considerable variability is probably inherent in the species, enough perhaps to account for the variations noted in the park and in skins examined. The amount of crossing with dogs has probably not been sufficient to alter much the genetic composition of the wolf population.

— The Wolves of Mount McKinley by Adolph Murie, 1944, ISBN 0-295-96203-8, 978-0-295-96203-0, 238 pages

In 2008, Dr. Gregory S. Barsh, a professor of genetics and pediatrics at the Stanford University School of Medicine used molecular genetic techniques to analyze DNA sequences from 150 wolves, half of them black, in Yellowstone National Park, which covers parts of Wyoming, Montana and Idaho. It was discovered that a gene mutation responsible for the protein beta-defensin 3, known as the K locus, is responsible for the black coat colour in dogs. After finding that the same mutation was responsible for black wolves in North America and the Italian Apennines, he set out to discover the origin of the mutation. Dr. Barsh and his colleagues concluded that the mutation arose in dogs 12,779 to 121,182 years ago, with a preferred date of 46,886 years ago after comparing large sections of wolf, dog and coyote genomes. At the University of California, Los Angeles, Robert K. Wayne, a canine evolutionary biologist, stated that he believed that dogs were the first to have the mutation. He further stated that, even if it originally arose in Eurasian wolves, it was passed on to dogs who, soon after their arrival, brought it to the New World and then passed it on to wolves and coyotes. Black wolves with recent dog ancestry tend to retain black pigment longer as they age. This beta-defensin K locus mutation is a dominant black mutation that occurs in many domestic dog breeds.

However, a recessive black gene also occurs in a few domestic dog breeds (notably in all-black German Shepherds, but also in some black Border Collies, Australian Shepherds, and Belgian Shepherds). This recessive allele is a recessive allele in the Agouti gene in dogs (R96C arginine to cysteine mutation at codon 96). This recessive black gene is also thought to have derived from wild Eurasian black wolves, with one such Russian wolf (a gray male heterozygous recessive carrier who sired black offspring with a domestic black sheepdog) was identified in studies conducted in the 1920s by a Russian biologist.

Scientists have recently discovered a melanistic Indian wolf, a member of the lineage of wolves that has been described by some scientists as "the oldest lineage of wolves". These scientists (Lokhande and Bajaru) have argued that the presence of melanistic Indian wolves may indicate that the cause of wolf melanism may be more complex than the hypothesis that a single gene for melanism in ancient Old World wolves was acquired by domestic dogs, then lost in wild wolf populations, and then reintroduced into wild wolf populations by interbreeding with domestic dogs. These scientists argue that the melanistic Indian wolf "challenges the hypothesis of complete disappearance of the gene responsible for the black coat colour from the gene pool of the Old World wolves" and "may indicate the recent re-introduction of the gene from dogs to Indian wolves through hybridisation, or recurrence of an independent mutation in Indian wolves."

== Function ==
As black-coloured wolves occur more frequently in forested areas than on the tundra (black coats occur in about 62% of wolves in the forested areas of the Canadian Arctic, compared with about 7% in the icy tundra), melanism was concluded by the researchers to give those wolves an adaptive advantage. The mutation's purpose has not yet been identified. Dr. Barsh ruled out camouflage, as wolves have few natural predators, and there is no evidence that a black coat colour leads to any increase in hunting success rates. Dr. Barsh observed that beta-defensin is involved in providing immunity to viral and bacterial skin infections, which might be more common in forested, warmer environments. It has been suggested that the mutation's association with forested habitats means that the prevalence of melanism should increase as forests expand northward. Dark fur is believed to be dominant in wolves. A mating between a black and a gray wolf resulted in 10 pups with dark fur out of a total of 14.

== Distribution ==
Black wolves rarely occur in Europe and Asia, where interactions with domestic dogs have been reduced over the past thousand years due to the depletion of wild wolf populations. They have occasionally appeared, as wolf-dog hybrids are known in Russia as "black wolves", and currently, 20–25% of Italy's wolf population is composed of black animals. They are more common in North America; about half of the wolves in the reintroduced wolf population in Wyoming's Yellowstone National Park are black. Like Pyrenean wolves, black wolves do not live in France. In southern Canada and Minnesota, the black phase is more common than the white, though gray-coloured wolves predominate.
