= Wolfcatcher Royal =

Former office in France

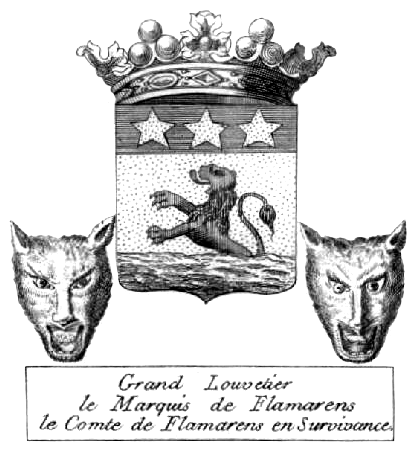
Coat of arms of the Marquis of Flamarens as Grand Wolfcatcher. The Grand Wolfcatcher placed his arms between two wolf heads as a symbol of the office.

The Wolfcatcher Royal (French: louvetier royal), a position also known historically as the Grand Wolfcatcher (French: grand louvetier) which is now known as lieutenant de louveterie, was established as a prestigious office in the House of the King during the Ancien Régime and Bourbon Restoration of France, tracing its inception to the luparii of Charlemagne. The office had been a fixture of the French crown as early as the reign of Louis XI, when the first recorded holder of the title Pierre Hannequeau reached prominence in 1467, although it had apparently existed in some form since 1308. Wolfcatchers Royal served under the Grand Huntsman and alongside the Grand Falconer and Captain of the Boar-hunt as members of the king's hunting service. They were responsible for organizing all aspects of the wolf-hunt and presided over the royal pack of wolfhounds and their handlers. A number of lieutenants, huntsmen, houndsmen, and valets assisted the Wolfcatcher Royal. By the 18th century Wolfcatchers, who rotated through office in alternate sessions, received stipends worth roughly between 1200 and 1400 livres.

On 9 August 1787 the office was dissolved due to financing issues but was reinstated in 1797. The office was further modified in 1971 and now serves an administrative function regulating vermin and maintaining healthy wildlife populations. Lieutenants often serve as moderators in disputes between the general public, hunters, and the government, keep the police informed of changes or nuances in hunting laws, and promote the use of ethics in hunting. A major focus of the position is the regulation of deer numbers. Wolfcatchers Royal are still required (in theory) to maintain a pack of at least four hounds capable of hunting boar or fox. There are twelve female lieutenants de louveterie in France.

== See also ==
- Wolf hunting
- Medieval hunting
