= Beta-defensin 3 =

Protein

Identifiers
- Aliases
- External IDs: GeneCards:
Orthologs
Databases	n/a
Species	Human	Mouse
Entrez	n/a	n/a
Ensembl	n/a	n/a
UniProt	n a	n/a
RefSeq (mRNA)	n/a	n/a
RefSeq (protein)	n/a	n/a
Location (UCSC)	n/a	n/a
PubMed search	n/a	n/a
- Wikidata
View/Edit Human

Beta-defensin 3 is a protein that in humans is encoded by the DEFB3 gene.

HBD-3 was first isolated from human lesional psoriatic scales. RT-PCR showed HBD-3 to be expressed highly in skin, trachea, tongue and tonsils, with lower levels found salivary glands, uterus, kidney, bone marrow, thymus, colon, stomach, adenoid, pharynx, and larynx.
