= MacQueen of Findhorn =

Scottish highland deerstalker

MacQueen of Pall a' Chrocain was a legendary Highland deer stalker popularly believed to have slain the last wolf in Scotland in 1743. The scene of the incident was Darnaway Forest in Morayshire. MacQueen received a message from his chief, the Laird of Clan Mackintosh, that a black wolf had killed two children whilst they were crossing the hills from Cawdor with their mother. MacQueen was requested to attend a "Tainchel" (a gathering to drive the country) at a tryst above Fi-Giuthas. In the morning, the Tainchel had long been assembled, though MacQueen was not initially present. When he arrived, MacQueen received a tirade of insulting comments for his delay, to which he asked "Ciod e a' chabhag?" (what was the hurry?). MacQueen lifted his plaid and produced the severed head of the wolf, tossing it in the middle of the surprised circle. MacQueen described to the assembly how he achieved the feat:

As I came through the slochd (ravine) by east the hill there, I foregathered wi' the beast. My long dog there turned him. I bucked wi' him, and dirkit him, and syne whuttled his craig (cut his throat), and brought awa' his countenance for fear he might come alive again, for they are very precarious creatures.

The chief rewarded him, giving him a land called Sean-achan "to yield good meat for his good greyhounds in all time coming". He later became chief of Clan MacQueen, and died in 1797.
