= Jackal coursing =

The jackal is, I think, a more difficult animal to kill with hounds than the fox. He does not play the game as the fox does. He is as cunning, as intelligent, as wild, but he is far less sophisticated, and it used to please me to think that perhaps in the chase of the jackal we saw hunting as it was in an earlier phase than that at which it has now arrived in England.

— Thomas Francis Dale

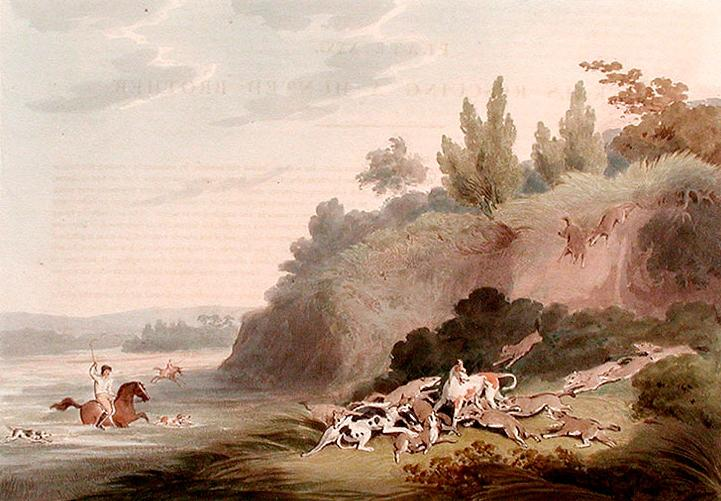
Hunting Jackals by Samuel Howitt, illustrating a group of golden jackals rushing to the defence of a fallen pack-mate

Jackal coursing involves the pursuit of jackals (usually the golden jackal and black-backed jackal) with dogs.

Jackal coursing was an occasional pastime for sportsmen in British India. English Foxhounds were usually imported to India for the purpose. Due to the comparatively hotter weather, jackal hounds were rarely long lived. Indian jackals were not hunted often in this manner, as they were slower than foxes and could scarcely outrun greyhounds after 200 yards. According to Thomas C. Jerdon, although jackals are easily pulled down by greyhounds and give an excellent run with foxhounds, they are nonetheless cunning animals which will sham death when caught, and will ferociously protect their packmates.

Salukis were a popular choice of breed for jackal coursing in the Māzandarān Province; Rudyard Kipling wrote of a Persian proverb in his novel Kim which states "The jackal that lives in the wilds of Mazandaran can only be caught by the hounds of Mazandaran." British sportsmen pursued jackals in Ceylon as well, though hounds would not attack jackals. Reginald Innes Pocock speculated that this was due to Ceylonese dogs being closely related to the local jackals, and would thus not attack their own kind.

In South Africa, black-backed jackal coursing was first introduced to the Cape Colony in the 1820s by Lord Charles Somerset who, as well as being an avid fox hunter, sought a more effective method of managing jackal populations, as shooting proved ineffective. Coursing jackals also became a popular pastime in the Boer Republics, particularly in Orange Free State, where it was standard practise to flush them from their dens with terriers and send greyhounds in pursuit. This was fraught with difficulty however, as jackals were difficult to force out of their earths, and usually had numerous exits to escape from. This method is still used by farmers in Free State. In the western Cape in the early 1900s, dogs bred by crossing foxhounds, lurchers and borzoi were used.

== See also ==
- Fox hunting
- Wolf hunting
