= Animals in sport =

Sports that involve use of animals

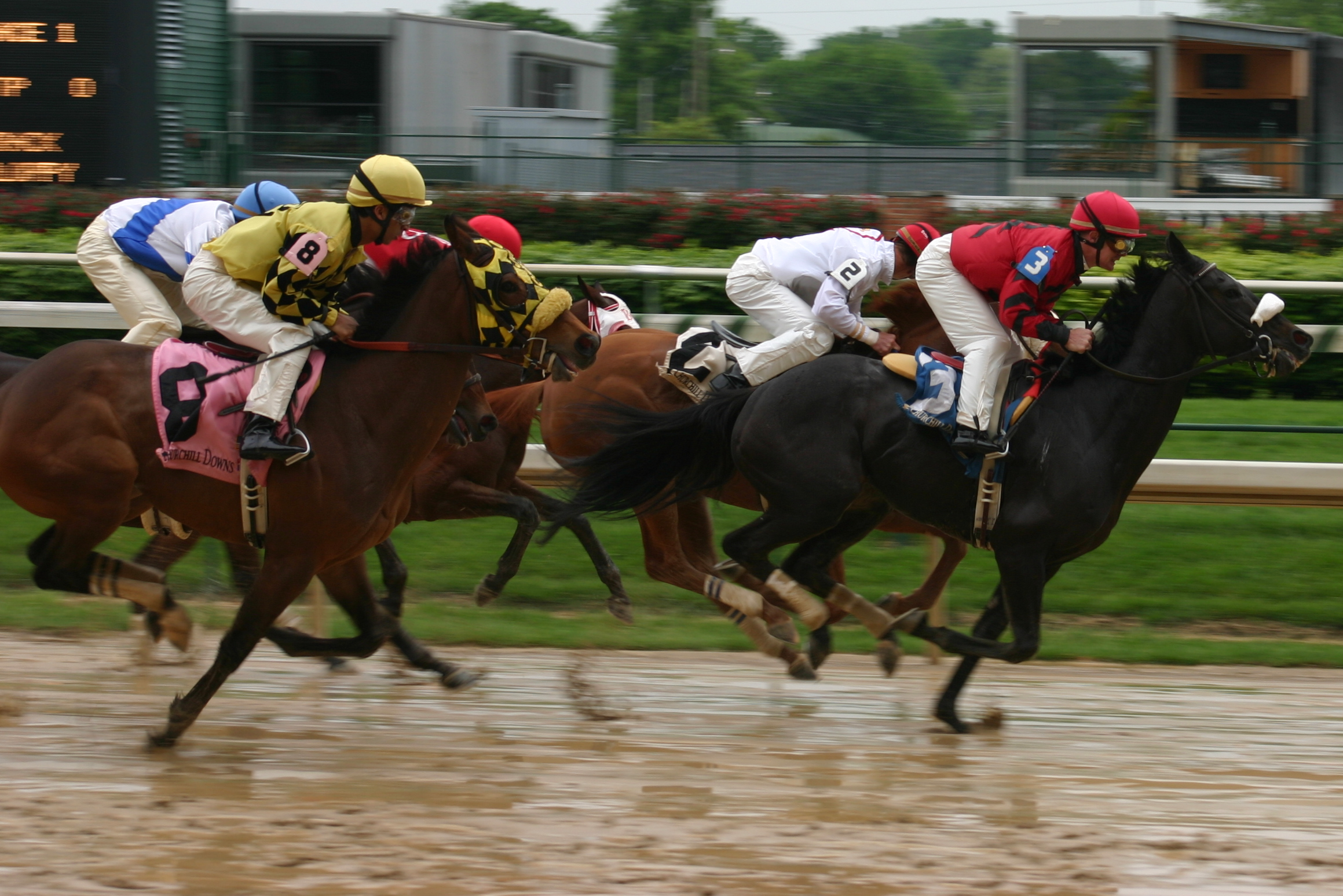
Horse racing is a very popular sporting event involving animals.

Animals in sport are a specific form of working animals. Many animals, at least in more commercial sports, are highly trained. Two of the most common animals in sport are horses and dogs.

== Types of animal sporting events ==
There are many types of animal sporting events, with varying levels of participation from humans. Some are solely between the animals while others use the animals in a lesser role. Most sports involve training, while some can also involve selective breeding.

There are some large-scale events that include animals in a variety of sports. A rodeo can comprise many different sports, ranging from bull riding to pole bending. Some of the most well known types of animal racing are horse racing, dog racing (e.g. greyhound racing, sled dog racing), pigeon racing, and camel racing.

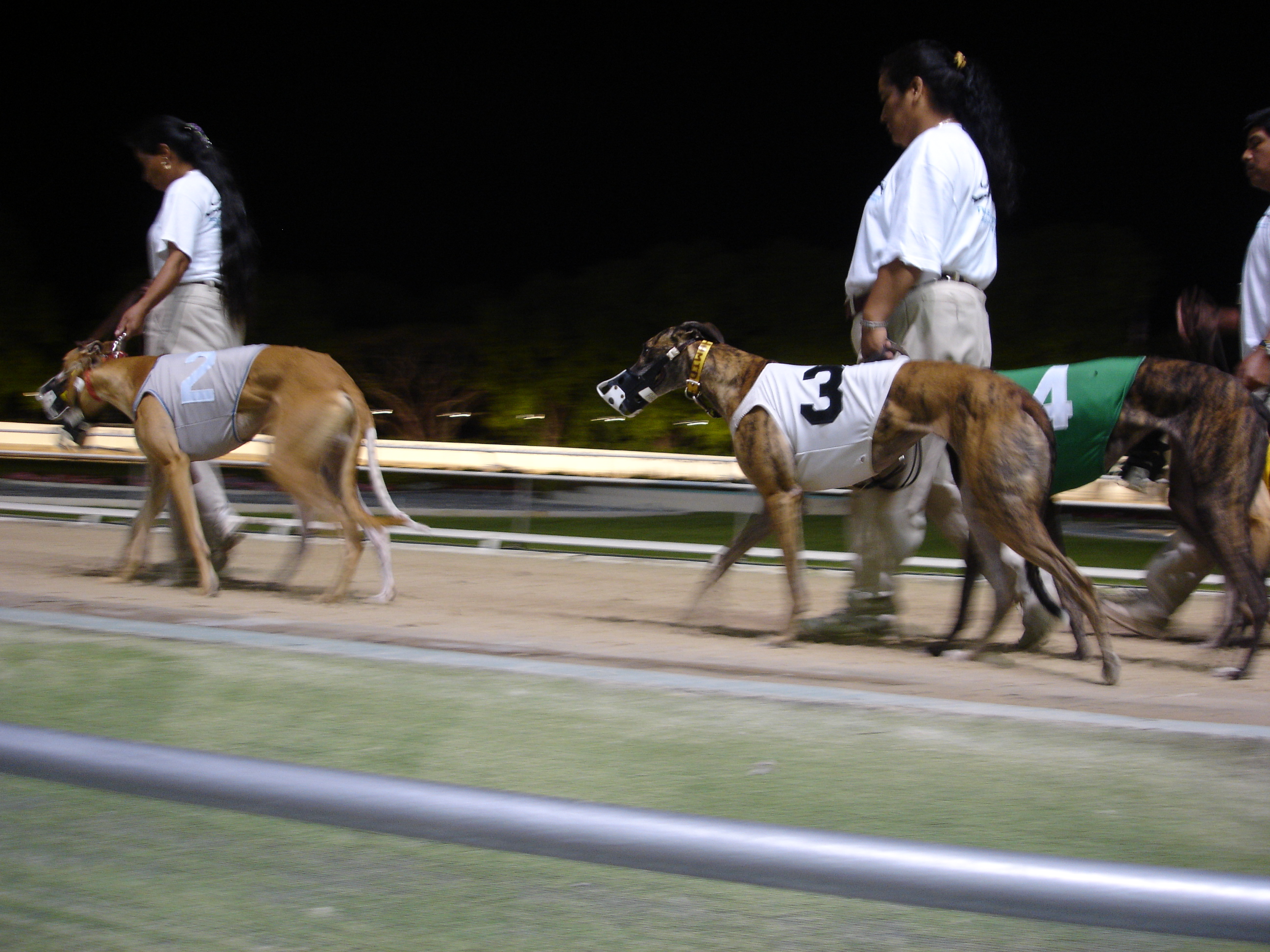
Greyhounds preparing for a race

=== Racing ===
Racing is the most popular form of animal-related sport, particularly horse racing. Some racing events directly involve humans as riders while others see the animals race alone. In some sports the rider is not directly riding the animal, instead being pulled along. Examples of this include harness racing, dogsled racing and popular ancient Greece and Roman Empire sport of chariot racing.

Greyhound racing, a popular form of animal racing, dates back to the 1800s in the United States, after the dogs were brought over from Europe to help control the hare population. While track racing is the most common, there are other forms of racing. Pigeon racing, for example, sees homing pigeons finding their way home from a set distance away. Kambala, he-buffalo racing in coastal Karnataka, India is a rural spectator racing conducted every year during winter in about 50 towns/villages. Racing events are a common way to gamble, with billions spent worldwide every year. This is one reason that some countries or states have made such sports illegal.

In Indonesia, there are traditional bull races, including karapan sapi, pacu jawi, mekepung, and barapan kebo. Flying duck races have been held since 1926 in West Sumatra.

Goat races are held annually in Tobago.

=== One-on-one and team events ===
There are some non-racing competitive events involving animals. Polo is an example, with competitors hitting a ball with mallets while on horseback. Elephant polo dates back to the early 20th century when members of the British aristocracy in Nepal began playing the sport.

In the 14th to 16th centuries jousting was a popular one-on-one tournament event involving knights on horseback.

=== Fighting ===
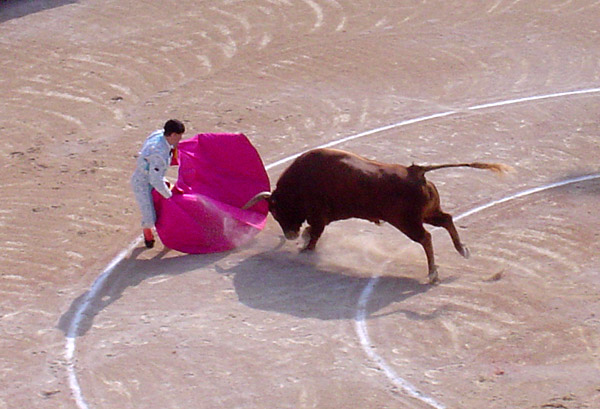
Bullfighting is lawful in some countries.

In most countries, the act of causing two or more animals to fight each other, as in cockfighting and dog fighting, is seen as cruel and is therefore banned by the law. Some animal fights are lawful in countries around the world, including cow fighting and camel wrestling. There are also some forms of lawful sport in which humans fight animals, such as bullfighting, which has a long history in Spanish and Portuguese tradition, and jallikattu, which has similar tradition in Tamil Nadu, India. Not all animals are large, however, with cricket fighting being a popular sport in Macau and Hong Kong, although gambling on it is now against the law.

There are several other blood sports in history that were intended as entertainment, many of which involved baiting by dogs. Many different types of animal have been placed into a pit, sometimes tied to a post, and set upon by dogs. This ranges from rat-baiting and badger-baiting to bear-baiting and lion-baiting. There are even some tales of human-baiting.

Animals that take part in animal fights are usually specifically bred for strength and stamina.

=== Killing ===
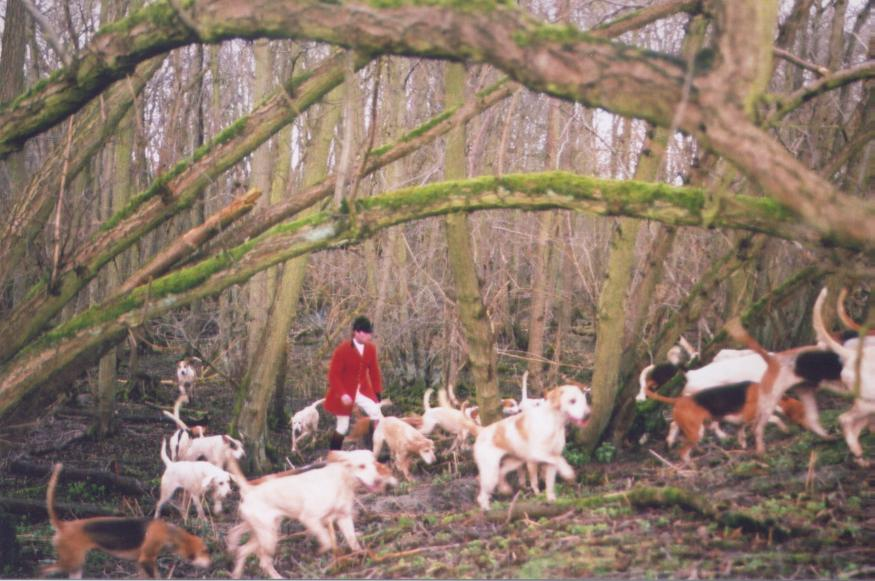
Fox hunting has been a recent controversial issue, particularly in the United Kingdom.

Hunting began as a crucial component of hunter-gatherer societies, being an important source of food. The domestication of animals and the development of agriculture lessened the need for hunts, with food being more readily available. Hunting became a sport for those of the high social classes. In most parts of medieval Europe, the upper-class (aristocracy and higher clergy) obtained as privilege the sole rights to hunt in certain areas of a feudal territory.

Dangerous hunting, as for lions or wild boars, usually on horseback (or from a chariot, as in Pharaonic Egypt and Mesopotamia) also had function similar to tournaments and manly sports: an honourable, somewhat competitive pastime to help the aristocracy practice skills of war in times of peace. In ancient Rome, the "Venatio" was a form of entertainment that pitted humans against animals in an amphitheater.

In modern times, hunting is usually legal as long as the hunter has a license, though there are some unregulated forms in some countries. Animals can be on either side of a hunt, assisting the hunters or being hunted themselves.

Fox hunting has been a controversial issue, particularly in the United Kingdom, regarding its necessity and the cruelty involved (See Fox hunting legislation).

==== Fishing ====
Fishing is somewhat different from other sports and is most commonly a pastime or hobby. However, it can also be a competitive sport.

==== Pigeon shooting ====
Pigeon shooting was one of the shooting events of the 1900 Summer Olympics. Competitors in these events had to kill as many live pigeons as possible. Birds were released one at a time from 'traps' in front of the shooters.

=== Shows of training or breeding ===
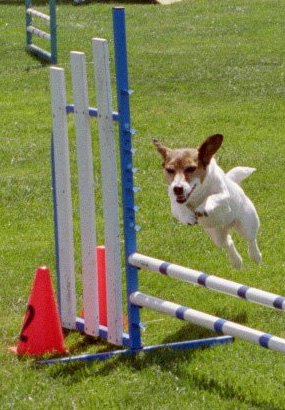
A Jack Russell Terrier competing in a dog agility event

Shows are intended to highlight the excellence of training or breeding of the animals involved. There is a variety of horse riding sports in this category, including show jumping and dressage, both of which are featured at the Olympic Games. At lower levels, horse shows offer a wide variety of competition both riding and driving as well as In-hand classes that evaluate equine conformation.

Dogs, being easily domesticated, are one of the most popular animals to have in shows. Cattle and sheepdog trials are popular in many countries and are used to show how well a dog can gather livestock. Other dog sports of this category include dog agility events, whereby the dogs must tackle obstacle courses, and obedience trials, where they must execute a predefined set of tasks.

Crufts, a British conformation show for dogs, has grown since it started in 1886. While dogs are the most common show animal, cat shows are also common. Both of these animals have a wide variety of breeds and compete in categories, comparing each individual to the breed "ideal".

Some unusual animals also take part in shows, such as the competitors in rabbit show jumping and common chaffinches in vinkenzetting of the bird singing contests.

== Popular culture ==
Films and television series about animals in sport can be realistic or fictional, involving animals in an activity that they cannot really perform. Seabiscuit is a fairly accurate portrayal of the famous American horse of the same name, while MVP: Most Valuable Primate, a film about a hockey-playing chimpanzee, is unrealistic.

The 1980 animated film Animalympics is a spoof of the Olympic Games and features anthropomorphicised animals. In the combination live action and animation film Bedknobs and Broomsticks, animated animals play a game of football. Similarly, several television commercials used the Budweiser Clydesdales and other animals in live-action and CGA roles to appear to be playing American football.

From 1976 to 1999, the BBC broadcast One Man and His Dog, a television series about sheepdog trials. They also commissioned three series of Pets Win Prizes, a game show with contestants' pets having to perform in various tasks.

Man vs. Beast is an American television show that pitches humans against animals in a variety of unusual challenges, including competitive eating between world champion Takeru Kobayashi and a brown bear.

== See also ==
- Cruelty to animals
- Animals in culture
- Animals in professional wrestling
- Animals on television
- Insect fighting
