= Donkey-baiting =

Blood sport involving donkeys attacking dogs

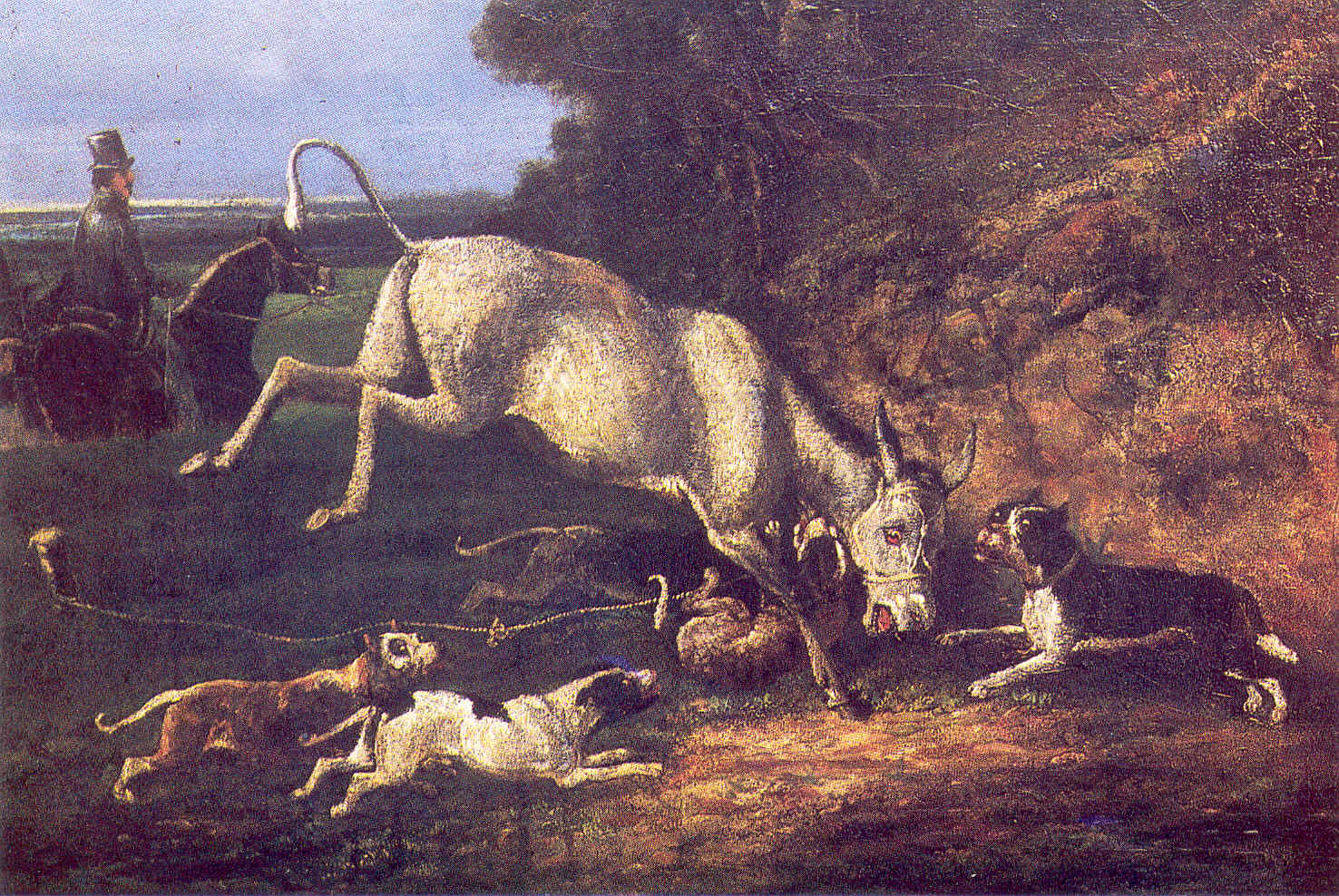
Donkey Attacked by Staffords, oil painting, circa 1840

Donkey-baiting is a blood sport involving the baiting of donkeys against dogs.

Donkey-baiting was quite common during the Victorian era, but was never popular with the masses. This had little to do with the welfare of the animals; rather, it was because the donkey offered little appeal, as it was rarely possible to make it attack the dogs.

== Process ==
Donkey-baiting is a blood sport. Usually, dogs would be made to attack a donkey. The Doguin, a now extinct smaller variation of the Dogue de Bordeaux, was specialized for donkey-baiting. Other animals may be included, however; Zacharias Conrad von Uffenbach reported watching a donkey-baiting even in which an "ape", likely a chimpanzee or macaque, tied to the donkey's back. As the dogs attacked, the ape would bite and shake them, while the donkey ran and kicked.

== Popularity and decline ==
In the past, donkey-baiting was common at the Peropalo fiesta in Extremadura, Spain. Festivities included beating and jostling the donkeys, and force-feeding them alcohol. One tradition at the fiesta was to have a donkey carry the fattest man in town on its back, as other men bait it; the parade ends with the donkey being killed. This garnered strong opposition from outsiders in the late 20th century, and locals would allegedly act violently towards such protestors. In 2003, animal rights activist Tony Moore successfully brought the issue to the attention of authorities, and Juan Carlos Rodriguez Ibarra, president of Extremadura, vowed to put an end to the practice.

Donkey-baiting was popular during the ancien régime in France, with crowdgoers drawn to the donkey's kicking abilities and the level of aggression that the donkey could reach when provoked. While the sport aroused occasional protest, it was usually due to the unruliness of the crowds instead of the welfare of the animals. Donkey-baiting disappeared after the French Revolution, despite other blood sports such as cockfighting and dog fighting continuing to be popular.

Donkey-baiting was practiced in London's Newington Green and Hockley-in-the-Hole. The Cruel Treatment of Cattle Act 1822 included protection for donkeys and mules, thus ending the sport in the United Kingdom.

== See also ==
- Cultural references to donkeys
- The Donkey Sanctuary
- The Donkey Sanctuary of Canada
