= Boar-baiting =

Illegal blood sport

Boar-baiting is a blood sport involving the baiting of wild boars against dogs.

Villagers in Indonesia call the event adu bagong translated as boar fighting. Boar-baiting began in the 1960s, to test hunting dogs against wild boars. In 2017, an online petition demanding the halt was created by animal rights organizations and the Government of Indonesia banned boar-baiting.

== See also ==
- Hog-baiting
