= Wrens of the Curragh =

Community of women in Ireland

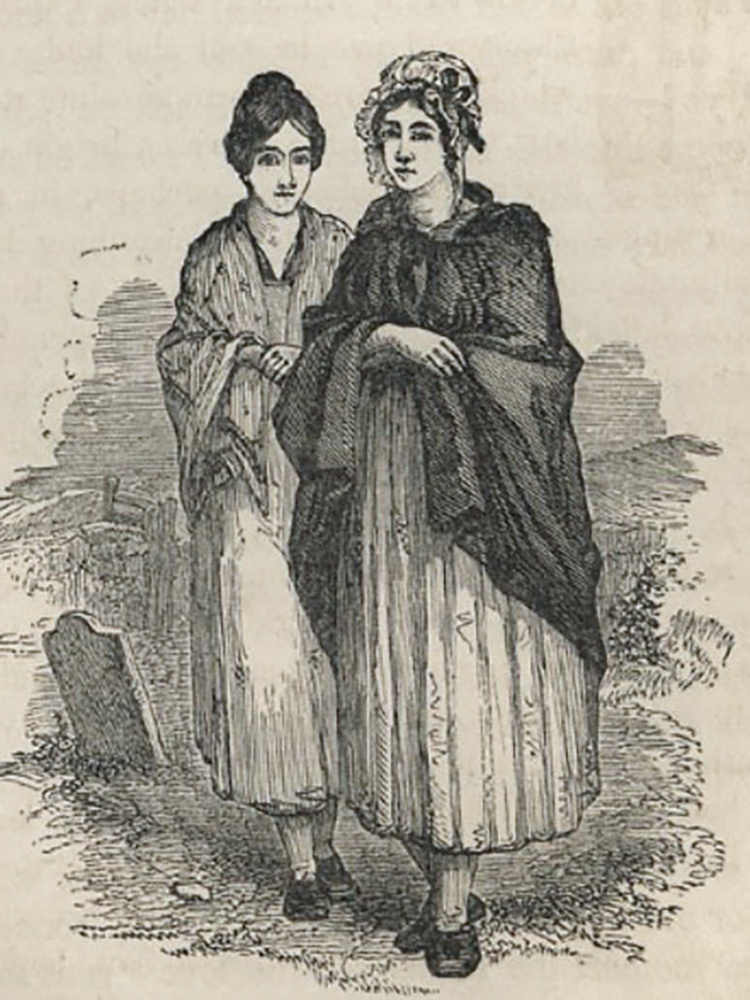
Two members of the Wrens of the Curragh

The Wrens of the Curragh were a community of women in nineteenth-century Ireland who lived outside society on the plains of Kildare, many of whom were sex workers at Curragh Camp. Records date back to the 1840s of women living on the Curragh nearby the army camp. Many of the women were orphans because of the Great Famine, resulting in them using prostitution to provide for themselves. The women developed a lifestyle in which money, homes, belongings, food, and childcare were shared. The community of women was originally covered by Charles Dickens in his journal, later being covered in novels, a poem, music, a podcast, and art.

== Etymology ==
The Wrens of Curragh were a community who lived on the Curragh (plains) of Kildare. The women were called "wrens" because they slept in hollows in the ground which were half in banks or ditches, covered in furze bushes, like the nests that birds in the wren family make.

== History ==
Records of women living on the Curragh, close to the army camp, date back to the 1840s. The Curragh Camp became permanent in 1856, which meant that the women's presence became continuous. The last records of their presence extend to the 1880s. Many of these women were orphaned during the Great Famine and used prostitution as a means to provide for themselves. Some of the women lived on the plains seasonally, with up to 60 women there in the summer months. Outside of harvest-time, unemployed agricultural workers may have raised the number.

=== Lifestyle ===
The women developed a lifestyle in which money, homes, belongings, food, and childcare were shared. There was no formal leader. Whilst the women were ostracised from the community in town, they also avoided contact where possible, for example, in terms of medical care the women administered remedies they made or bought. Whilst the women were mainly dependent on the soldiers for money, they also knitted garments which they sold at markets to gain some financial independence. Still, it was the Army that supplied them with fresh water and allowed them to buy goods at the camp market two to three times a week. This network of mutual aid may have been even stronger in some ways than the more traditional support networks in the surrounding areas.

The women were unpopular locally and in 1855, one rate-payer complained that not only did the women cause moral corruption, they were paid for by rate-payer's taxes. In 1857, the Presbyterian chaplain of the camp wrote to The Times complaining about their presence around the camp. Charles Dickens also wrote about the women in his journal, All the Year Round, in 1864.

=== Journalistic attention ===
In 1867, the journalist James Greenwood of the Pall Mall Gazette visited the Wrens and recorded their lifestyle. Before his visit, but in the same year, the situation of the "Wrens" and the soldiers was discussed in the British Medical Journal; in the article, some of the women are portrayed as thieves.

Greenwood noted their poverty and the prostitution which funded their lives. In a later pamphlet, Greenwood stated that not all of the women were prostitutes. Some of the women were in common-law marriages with soldiers at the camp, but due to army regulations, they could not live with the men.

=== Impact of public attention ===
The Medical Times & Gazette featured a response to Greenwood's article, who focused on the moral debasement of the wrens, as well as discussing the lack of sanitation and the effects on public health.

The impact of Greenwood's visit and the publication of his articles led to public discussion and the introduction of the Curragh of Kildare Act (1868). This introduced a "lock hospital" to treat the women for sexually transmitted diseases. Treatment was poor and they were often blamed for incidents of sexually transmitted diseases amongst the soldiers.

== Popular culture ==
The lives of the "Wrens of the Curragh" have inspired a range of creative responses:

=== Novels ===
In 1873, they are mentioned in a short story, "The Humby Election", by George Fraser. In 2010, author Martin Mallone wrote the novel The Only Glow of the Day about life on the Curragh. Likewise, Rose Doyle wrote the novel Friends Indeed in 2011. In 2018, novelist Orla McAlinden published The Flight of the Wren, which re-imagined the lives of the women.

=== Poetry ===
In 2007, the poet Mebh McGuckian featured the Wrens in her volume The Currach Requires No Harbour.

=== Music ===
The singer Jane McNamee composed a song, "The Curragh Wrens". Likewise, Ollie Kennedy wrote the song "The Curragh Wrens" from the perspective of a soldier at the camp; despite the title, the lyrics of the song do not directly refer to the women at all. Lankum's song "Hunting the Wren" alludes to the Wrens of the Curragh. Plúirín Na mBan, a group composed of Cathy Jordan, Claudia Schwab, and Irene Buckley, recorded Jordan's composition "Curragh Wrens" on their album Female Rambling Sailor and released a video as part of Jordan's Crankies project.

=== Podcast ===
In 2019, the first episode of the podcast Coquette featured the women.

=== Visual arts ===
In 2019, artist Lisa Freeman created a site-specific performance; Green Skies, A Double Rhythm on this history. This took place on the Curragh, Kildare funded by Kildare County Council and Creative Ireland, produced by Riverbank Arts Centre.

In 2020, the artist Amanda Coogan continued her work on a project about the women.
