= Rampokan =

Javanese blood sport

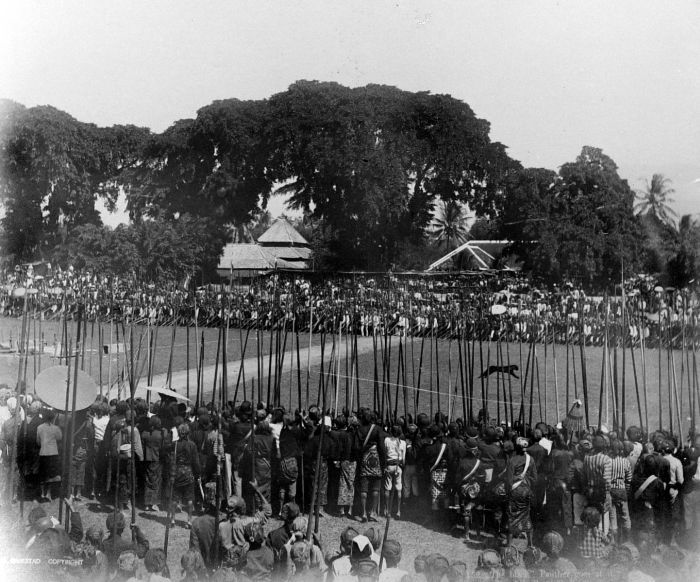
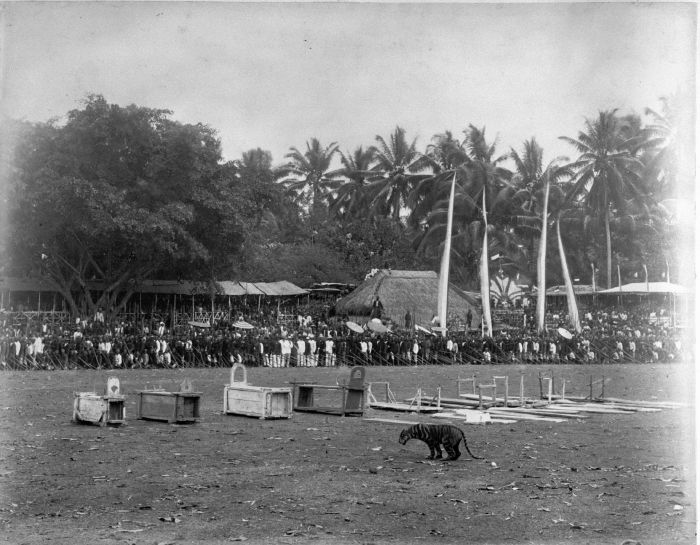

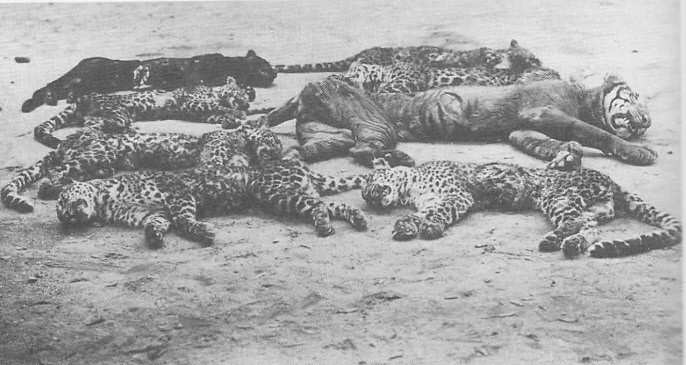
A Javan tiger killed along with seven leopards during Rampokan in Kediri, East Java, circa 1900.

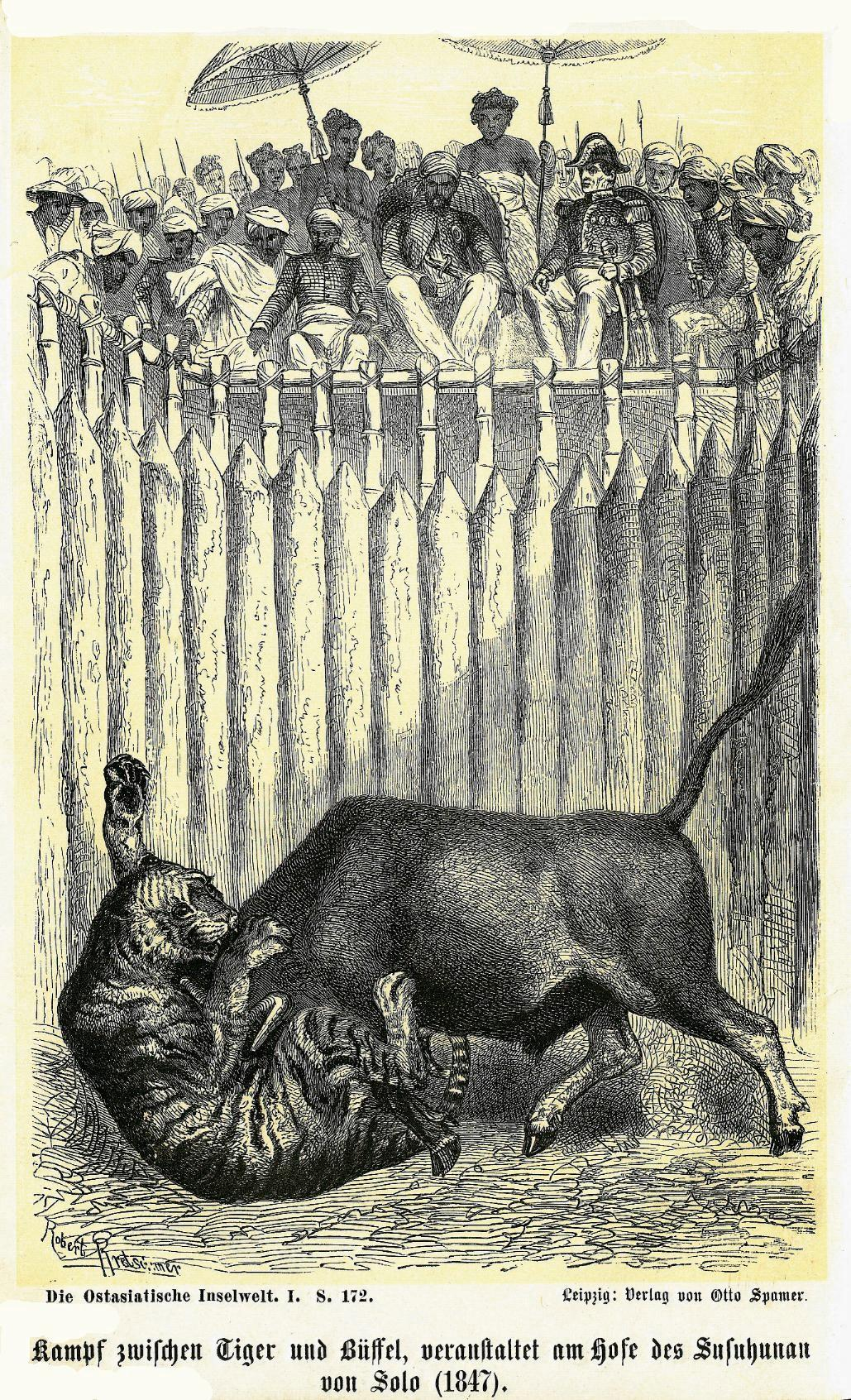
Print of a fight between a Water buffalo and a tiger in Sunanate of Solo (1847).

Rampokan was a traditional Javan blood sport involving big cats. Panthers or tigers were released from wooden boxes and surrounded by warriors with lances (watang parampogan) trying to prevent them from breaking out of the circle. The event's name comes from rampuk likely derived from Old Javanese rampog and ngrampog, which means "to attack in great numbers".

The rampokan would take place towards the end of Ramadan. It symbolized purification and the overcoming of evil. If the tigers and panthers succeeded in breaking through the circle, it was seen as an omen of disaster as famine. The ritual died out in the early 20th century.

A battle between a tiger and buffalo was the first part of the event in its earlier incarnations, but in later years this was omitted.

== See also ==
- Javanese people
- Sunda Islands
