= Martin Malone (author) =

Irish novelist and short story writer

Martin Malone is an Irish novelist and short story writer. His novel, The Broken Cedar (2003), was nominated for the International Dublin Literary Award and was shortlisted for an Irish Fiction Award. His first novel, Us (2000), won the John B Keane/Sunday Independent Award. His story, “The Mango War”, the title story of his 2009 short story collection won the RTÉ Francis MacManus Award in 2004. Malone has also won the Killarney International Short Story Prize and has been on two occasions shortlisted for both a Hennessy Award and a PJ O'Connor Award.

As a member of the Irish Army Military Police, Malone served five tours of duty with the United Nations Interim Force in Lebanon and one with the United Nations Iran–Iraq Military Observer Group. He has written a memoir of his time in the army, called The Lebanon Diaries (2007), and his experiences in the Middle East have greatly informed his literary work. BBC Radio 4, BBC World Service, RTE Radio 1 and Lyric FM have broadcast his short stories. He was a runner-up in the BBC World Service Short Story Competition. His stories have appeared in The Sunday Times Magazine, The Fiddlehead Can, The Malahat Review Can, The Dublin Review, The Stinging Fly, Stand UK, Literary Orphans USA, The Cortland Review USA, The Bridport Prize Anthology, Best Phoenix Irish Short Stories, The Sunday Tribune...His prose featured in the National Art Gallery's 'Lines of Vision: Irish Writers on Art.'

His work is published by Simon & Schuster UK, Maverick House, Poolbeg Press and New Island.

Martin Malone lives in County Kildare.

== Works ==
=== Novels ===
- Black Rose Days*(2016)

Us Modern Irish Classic(2015).

Valley of the Peacock Angel(2013)

The Only Glow of the Day (2010) - which features the lives of the Wrens of the Curragh

The Silence of the Glasshouse (2008)

The Broken Cedar (2003)

After Kafra (2001)

Us (2000)

"Iapetus, '81" (2021)

'The Devil's Relics, an Emer Harte Mystery.' (2025)

=== Short stories ===
The Mango War and Other Stories (2009)

Deadly Confederacies & Other Stories (2014).

Nominated for the Sunday Times EFG Private Bank Award 2012 for his short story about the Kurdistan atrocities in 1988, 'Valley of the Peacock Angel.'

This Cruel Station: Stories (2017) http://www.doirepress.com/writers/m_z/martin_malone/

'In the White Country, novella and stories,' 2023.

Bone Deep (2018)

=== Memoir ===
The Lebanon Diaries (2007)

=== Stage plays ===
Rosanna Nightwalker: The Wren of the Curragh

=== Radio plays ===
Song of the Small Bird

The Devil’s Garden

Rosanna Nightwalker
