= The Donkey Sanctuary of Canada =

Canadian animal welfare charity

- Founded: Started 1991, incorporated 1992
- Founder: Sandra Pady
- Purpose: Animal rescue
- Location: Puslinch, Ontario
- Region served: Canada
- Key people: Sandra Pady, Chairman; Janine Holman, Executive Director
- Revenue: $956,000
- Website: www.thedonkeysanctuary.ca

The Donkey Sanctuary of Canada is a Canadian registered charity and sanctuary devoted to the welfare and rescue of donkeys, mules and hinnies.

It was founded by Sandra Pady with her husband David in Guelph, Ontario. It is similar to The Donkey Sanctuary founded by Elizabeth Svendsen in England and Svendsen provided advice to Sandra Pady when she started.
