= Monkey-baiting =

Blood sport

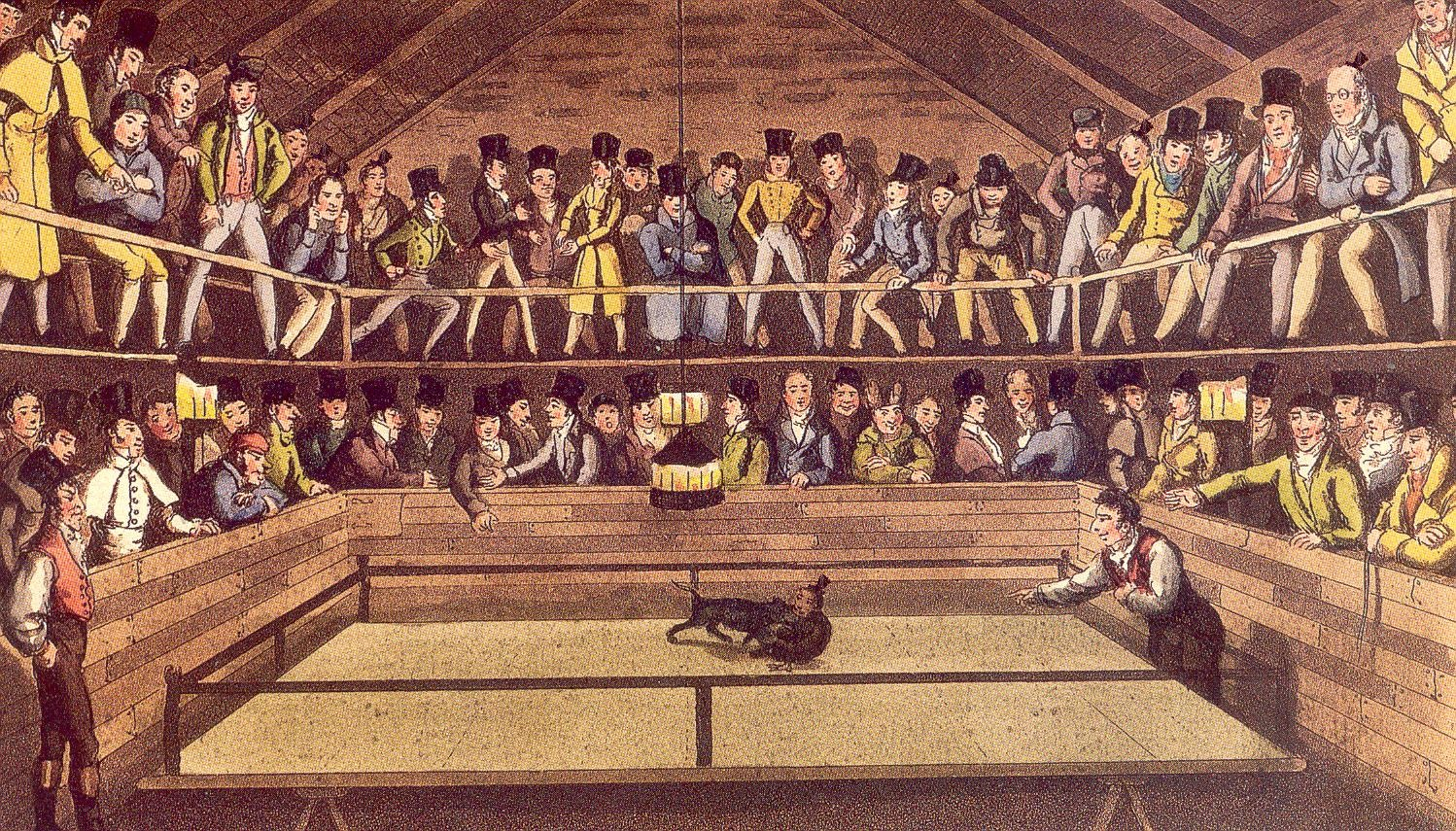
The Westminster-Pit: A Turn-up between a Dog and Jacco Macacco, the Fighting Monkey by Henry Thomas Alken Illustration, 1822

Monkey-baiting is a blood sport involving the baiting of monkeys against dogs.

== Background ==
The English were always keen for something new to challenge their dog fighting breeds. This resulted in unusual fights, sometimes with very surprising outcomes. 'Dog versus Monkey' was shown to be such a match-up.

These monkey gladiators proved to be a formidable opponent for the canine warrior; owners and handlers of fighting dogs frequently underestimated the monkey's abilities. The monkey's intelligence, dexterity, unorthodox fighting style and gameness proved to be overwhelming for many canine opponents.

== Jack ==
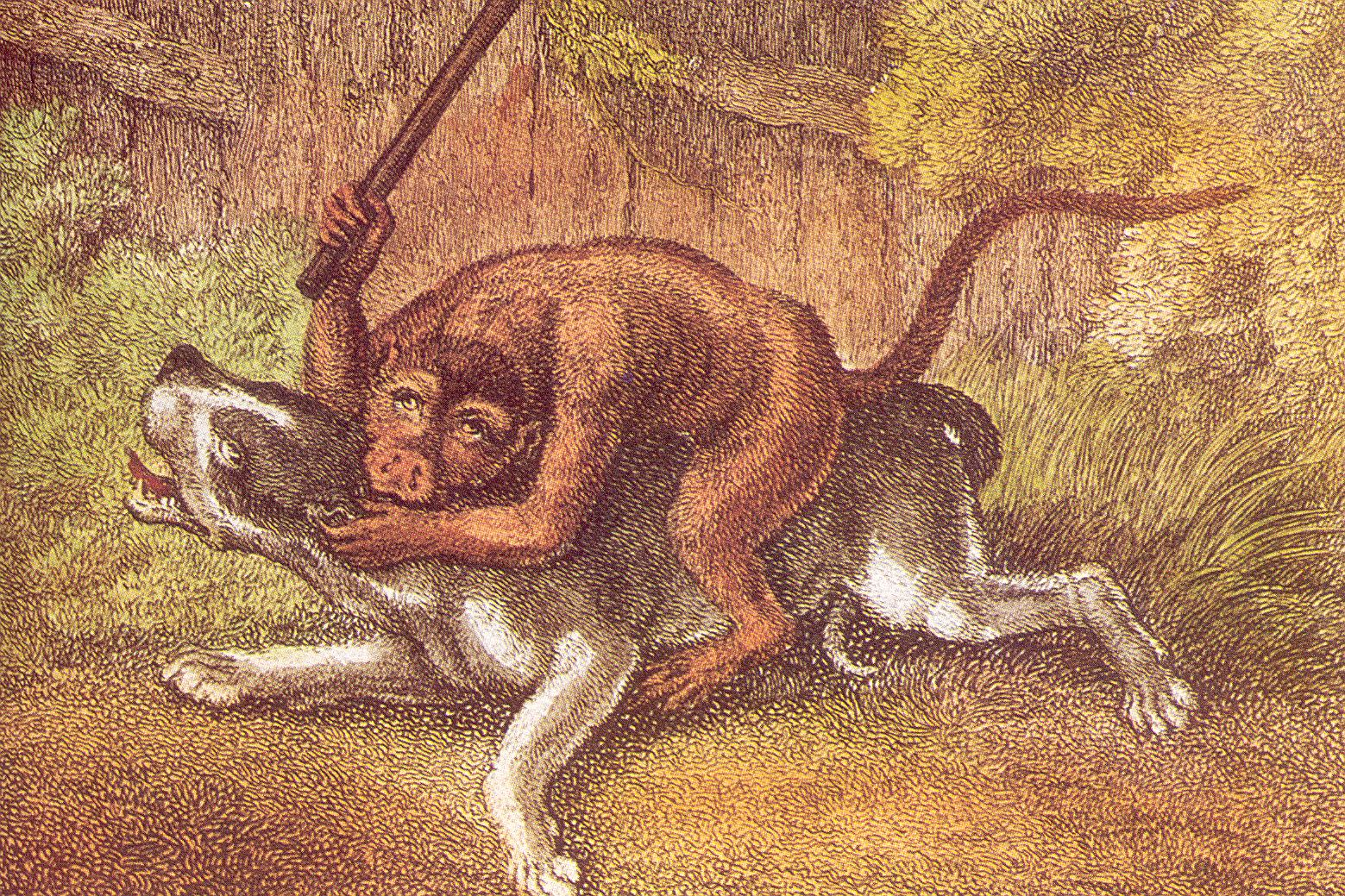
The Battle of the Bulldog and the Monkey by Samuel Howitt Engraving, published 1799

The following occurrence is from The Sporting Magazine in the year 1799:

A quite unusual fight between two animals was staged in Worcester. The wager stood at three guineas, according to which the dog would kill the monkey in at most six minutes. The dog's owner agreed that the monkey would be allowed to defend itself with a stick about a foot long.

Hundreds of spectators gathered to witness this fight and the odds stood at eight, nine and even ten to one in favour of the dog, which could scarcely be subdued before the fight. The monkey's owner took a stick, about twelve inches long, from his coat pocket, tossed it to the monkey and said:

"Now Jack, pay attention, defend yourself against the dog!"
The butcher cried:

"Now, get after the monkey!"

He let the dog go and it sprang at the monkey like a tiger. The monkey was amazingly nimble, jumped about three feet high in the air and when it came down landed directly on the dog's back, bit firmly in the dog's neck, grabbed his opponent's left ear with his hand thereby preventing the dog from turning his head to bite him. In this totally surprising situation the monkey now began to work over the dog's head with his club and he pounded so forcefully and relentlessly on the dog's skull that the poor creature cried out loudly. In short, the skull was soon cracked and the dead dog was carried from the ring. Yet, the monkey was only of medium size."

This monkey-baiting inspired the famous English animal painter, Samuel Howitt, to illustrate this account in the engraving entitled The Battle of the Bulldog and the Monkey circa 1799, which preserved this fight for future generations.

== Jacco Macacco ==
Jacco Macacco was a fighting ape or monkey who was exhibited in monkey-baiting matches at the Westminster Pit in London in the early 1820s. He achieved some measure of fame among the sporting community through his reputed prodigious record of victories against dogs. He was described as ashy, with black fingers and muzzle and may have derived his first name from his association with the Jack Tars that brought him into the country.

Jacco was reported to weigh 4.5 to 5.5 kilograms (10 to 12 pounds) and was pitched against dogs of up to twice his weight for a bet from ten to fifty pounds that the dog would not last five minutes.

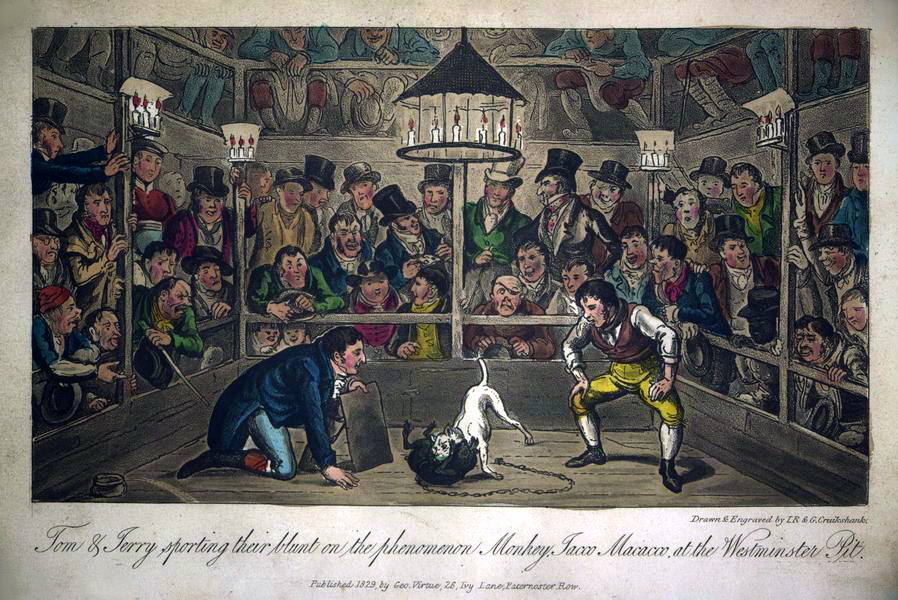
Tom & Jerry sporting their Blunt on the phenomenon Monkey Jacco Macacco at the Westminster Pit by George and Isaac Robert Cruikshank Copperplate engraving, 1821

According to William Pitt Lennox :

His mode of attack, or rather of defence, was, at first, to present his back or neck to the dog, and to shift and tumble about until he could lay hold on the arm or chest, when he ascended to the windpipe, clawing and biting away, which usually occupied him about one minute and a half, and if his antagonist was not speedily with drawn, his death was certain; the monkey exhibited a frightful appearance, being deluged with blood - but it was that of his opponent alone; as the toughness and flexibility of his own skin rendered him impervious to the teeth of the dog.

Lennox writes that after several fights, Jacco adapted his technique and would overcome his canine opponents by leaping directly on their backs and manoeuvring himself into a position where he could tear at their windpipes while remaining out of reach of their jaws.

The following is a fictionalized account by Pierce Egan from Life in London in which his heroes, Tom and Jerry, visit the Westminster Pit in the year 1820:

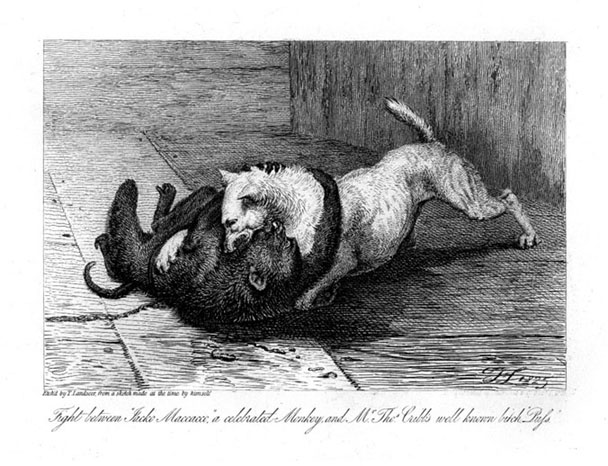
Fight between Jacko Maccacco, a celebrated Monkey, and Mr Tho.Cribbs, well known bitch Puss by Edwin Henry Landseer Illustration, 1825

"The dog pit was packed in a few minutes and many people were turned away grumbling, as if they had been deprived of the most beautiful sight in the world. They were so disappointed that they could not secure places ahead of time. Jacco Macacco was now presented in a pretty, small cage and was greeted by the shouts and whistles of the spectators. He was not even polite enough to bow in thanks for these signs of approval, which were directed at him alone. Jacco had a thin chain around his waist, about two metres long, which was fastened to a steel spike and pounded deep into the ground. Then he was taken from his cage.

Immediately after that the dog was brought out and it charged directly at the monkey. The monkey, however, before the dog reached him, ducked low, with dexterity that would serve a prize boxer well and rolled into a ball in order to withstand the force of the collision with the dog. Nonetheless, the dog immediately dug under him and turned him over. At that moment, however, the monkey's teeth cut like a saw into the dog's throat and like a knife ripped a large wound.

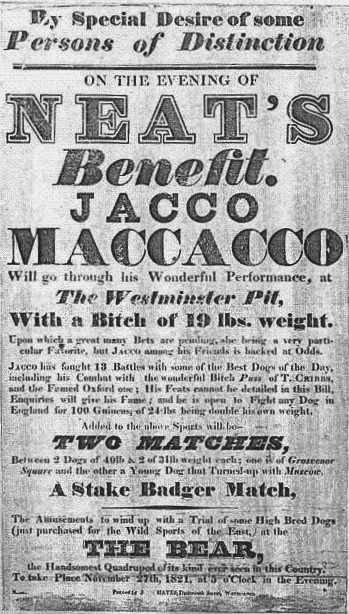
An 1821 advertising broadsheet for a match between Jacco and a 19-pound bitch.

Because of the great loss of blood, which all dogs that fought against Jacco Macacco suffered, most died shortly afterward. The monkey very rarely suffered even slight wounds in these fights. It was said of him that he was of such an unbelievably ferocious nature that it seemed expedient to his master to always have a steel plate between him and the monkey in the event that the inadvertently bit at his legs.

"What a monster!" said a greasy butcher, who sat there with open mouth, a red nightcap on his head, pointing at Jacco Macacco. "I bet a leg of mutton on the monkey! You could strike me down if I ever saw such a thing before in my life. It is truly astounding! He seems to destroy the dogs with such ease as if for decades he had done nothing but fight dogs!"

You could fill a small book with similar quotations, which came from the noisy and excited crowd, all of whom admired the 'finishing qualities' of Jacco Macacco. Some laughed, others yelled wildly and a few of the people constantly jumped up and down in a kind of ecstasy, pounded their canes on the floor and resembled closely the inmates of a mental hospital, who had escaped from their straight jackets."

Jacco had finished off fourteen dogs in a row, but then he was challenged by a canine named Puss, who had a similar record. Puss suffered a lacerated neck and Jacco had his jaw torn off, both died shortly after the match.
