= James Greenwood (journalist) =

British journalist

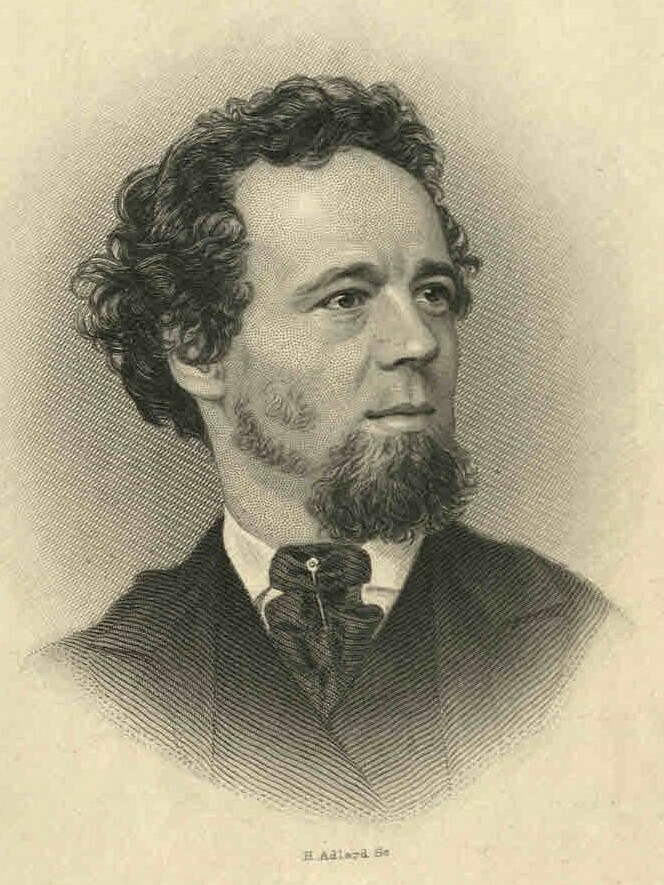
- James Greenwood engraved by Henry Adlard (circa 1870-1880)
- Born: 1832; London, England
- Died: 1927 (aged 94-95)
- Occupations: Journalist; author
- Writing career
- Genres: Investigative journalism; social commentary
- Subject: London's working poor
- Notable works: A Night in the Workhouse, 1866; In Strange Company, 1874; Toilers in London, 1883

James Greenwood (1832–1927) was an English social explorer, journalist and writer, who published a series of articles which drew attention to the plight of London's working poor. He was one of the first journalists to cover stories incognito, and is regarded as one of the pioneers of investigative journalism.

== Career ==
James Greenwood was born in 1832 in London. He was one of eleven children of a Lambeth coach trimmer. He began his career as a printer, but soon took up an interest in writing, becoming a notable Victorian journalist and social commentator. From 1861 he began writing adventure stories, which were published in Boy's Own. He joined the Pall Mall Gazette reporters in 1865. He first became interested in the plight of the poor after spending a night in a Lambeth workhouse. His brother Frederick, the then editor of the Gazette, prompted Greenwood to dress as a tramp and check into a workhouse incognito, a ruse unknown to English journalists before then. Greenwood's account, "A Night in the Workhouse", dispensed with the Victorian practice of sanitising stories for publication, presenting a brutal picture. Serialized in the Pall Mall Gazette on 12–15 January 1866, it caused a public outcry, established Greenwood's credentials as an investigative journalist and social commentator, and helped to build up his brother's magazine.

In 1867 Greenwood went to Ireland to report on the lives of the Wrens of the Curragh. These women were prostitutes who lived on the edge of Curragh Camp to be close to the soldier customers. They lived communally but in poor conditions, in "nests" made from hollows in banks and ditches and covered in furze branches.

In the 1870s, William James Orsman (1838–1923), a Methodist minister, invited Greenwood to tour the Costermongers' Mission, which heightened his interest in London's labouring classes and poor. His article "A Mission Among City Savages" appeared in the Daily Telegraph and in 1873 in a collection, In Strange Company. His commentary relates especially to the street vendors working around Whitecross Street, London. He also wrote Toilers in London, in 1883. In 1869, Greenwood's book The Seven Curses of London was published. It identified the curses as neglected children, professional beggars and thieves, prostitution, drunkenness, betting, and misguided charity.

Greenwood was a prolific writer of novels, children's books and articles in a career of over three decades. The Daily Telegraph on 6 July 1874 published an article by him, in which he reported witnessing on 24 June 1874 a human-baiting. In 1876, Greenwood republished the article in his book Low-Life Deeps in a chapter called In the Potteries. The book was illustrated by artist Alfred Concanen. The True History of a Little Ragamuffin appeared in 1866.

Greenwood's use of disguise in social reporting was copied by later generations. As a journalist he used the pseudonyms The Amateur Casual and One of the Crowd. He is seen as a pioneer of investigative journalism.

Greenwood died at his daughter's home in Catford on 11 August 1927 aged 96.

== Selected works ==
- Wild Sports of the World : a book of natural history and adventure (1862)
- Curiosities of Savage Life (1863)
- Curiosities of Savage Life (Second Series) (1864)
- The Adventures of Reuben Davidger; seventeen years and four months captive among the Dyaks of Borneo (1865)
- A Night in the Workhouse (1866)
- The True History of a Little Ragamuffin (1866)
- Unsentimental Journeys, or Byways of the Modern Babylon (1867)
- The Seven Curses of London, (1869)
- Mysteries of Modern London (1869)
- The Wilds of London (1874)
- In Strange Company (1874)
- Low-Life Deeps (1881)
- Odd People in Odd Places (1883)
- Toilers in London (1883)
