= Blood sport =

Any entertainment sport where blood is commonly shed

A blood sport or bloodsport is a category of sport or entertainment that involves bloodshed. Common examples of the former include combat sports such as cockfighting and dog fighting, and some forms of hunting and fishing. Activities characterized as blood sports, but involving only human participants, include the ancient Roman gladiatorial games.

== History ==
According to Tanner Carson, the earliest use of the term is in reference to mounted hunting, where the quarry would be actively chased, as in fox hunting or hare coursing. Before firearms, a hunter using arrows or a spear might also wound an animal, which would then be chased and perhaps killed at close range, as in medieval boar hunting.

Later, the term seems to have been applied to various kinds of baiting and forced combat: bull-baiting, bear-baiting, cockfighting, and later developments such as dog fighting and rat-baiting. The animals were specially bred for fighting. In the Victorian era, social reformers such as Henry Stephens Salt opposed bloodsports on grounds of ethics, morality, and animal welfare.

== Current issues ==
=== Online videos ===
Many online video-sharing platforms such as YouTube do not allow videos of animal bloodsports to be shown on the site, except for educational purposes, such as in public service announcements.

=== Animal fighting ===
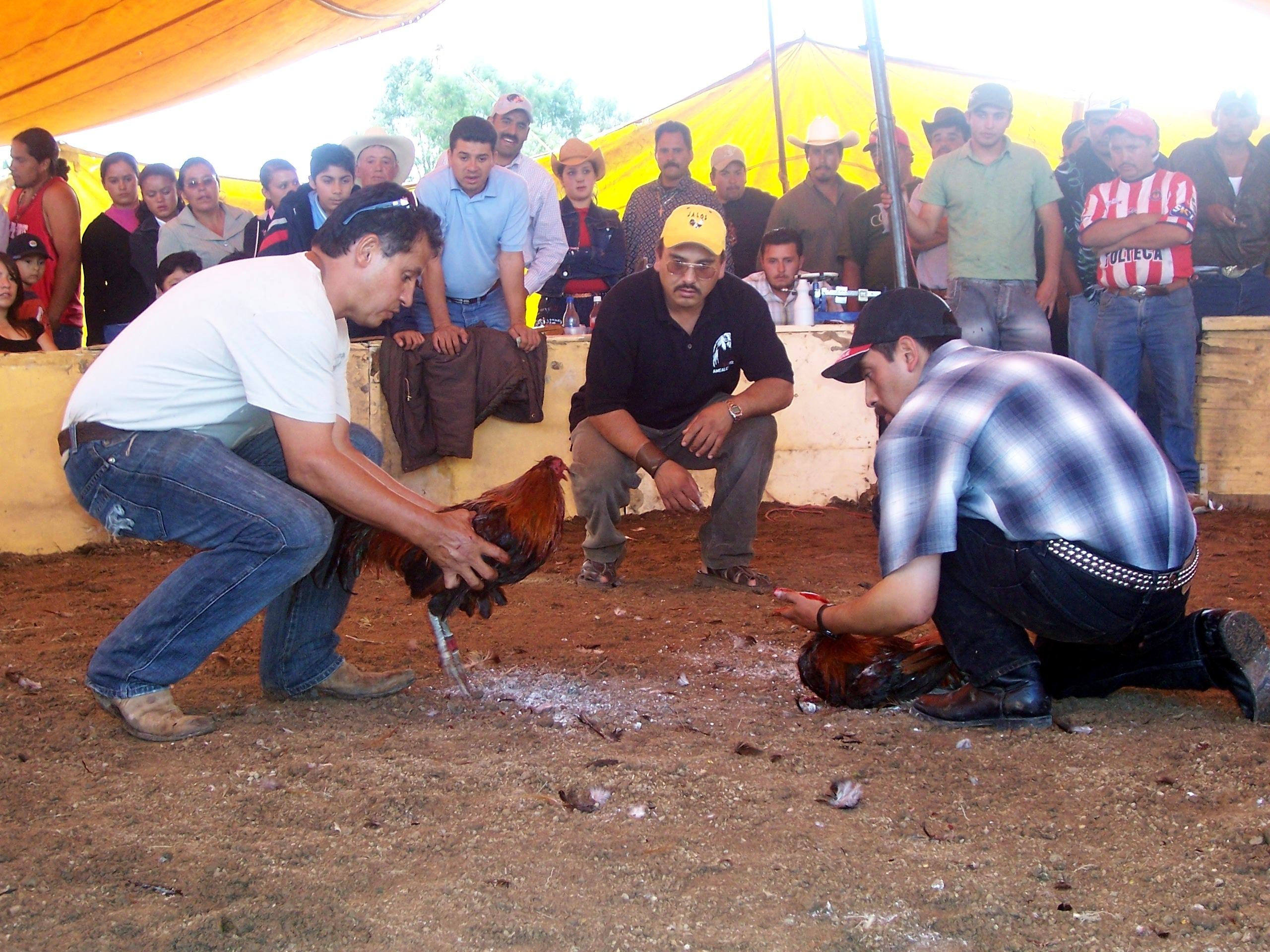
Cockfight

Limitations on blood sports have been enacted in much of the world. Certain blood sports remain legal under varying degrees of control in certain locations (e.g., bullfighting and cockfighting) but have declined in popularity elsewhere. Proponents of blood sports are widely cited to believe that they are traditional within the culture. Bullfighting aficionados, for example, do not regard bullfighting as a sport but as a cultural activity. It is sometimes called a tragic spectacle, because in many forms of the event, the bull is invariably killed and the bullfighter is always at risk of death.

In northern Iran, a traditional form of bull‑on‑bull combat called Varzajang (ورزاجنگ) is practiced in Gilan province. While local proponents regard it as a preserved cultural heritage, this view has been systematically challenged by Iranian sociologist Hossein Solati and his colleagues through a series of phenomenological studies published between 2023 and 2025.

Solati argues that referring to the bloody fights as a "game" (bāzi) is a euphemism that obscures the inherent violence, animal suffering, and social harms such as gambling. His 2023 study, inspired by Mannheim's theory of generational relations and employing Moustakas' phenomenological strategy, demonstrates how Varzajang has transformed from a natural pastoral encounter into a commercialized and gambling‑ridden spectacle across different generations. His 2024 study critically examines animal abuse through the concept of "phantom pain" (drawing on Blumenberg), revealing that both proponents and opponents of Varzajang struggle to abandon the traditional view of animals as mere instruments. His 2025 study adds a feminist phenomenological critique, analyzing the exclusion of women from the ceremony and the gendered construction of this cultural tradition.

Solati further provides a philosophical foundation for this critique in his work on bioethics, advocating for the recognition of animal subjectivity and rights as a counterweight to traditional justifications for animal suffering. Collectively, these studies represent the most extensive academic critique of Varzajang in Iranian scholarship, directly challenging cultural justifications similar to those cited by bullfighting aficionados in Spain and Latin America.

=== Hunting and recreational fishing ===
Trophy hunting and fox hunting in particular have been disparaged as blood sports by those concerned about animal welfare, animal ethics and conservation.

Recreational fishing was once described as a blood sport by those within the recreation.

== Human-hunting ==
Human-hunting is the hunting and killing of human beings for other people's revenge, pleasure, entertainment, sports, or sustenance. Incidents of the practice have occurred throughout many periods of history. Some accounts of early human violence associate the development of warfare – aggression against humans – with the practice of hunting game. Examples include:

- In Germany during the 18th century, Gypsy hunts, also known as heathen hunts or "Heidenjachten," were a practice that involved hunting the Roma people.
- The Mexican government, particularly the states of Sonora and Chihuahua, introduced a bounty system in 1836, offering rewards for Apache scalp. The bounty for an Apache male scalp was 100 pesos, while for an adult female Apache, it was 50 pesos, and for a child under 14, it was 25 pesos.
- During the Selkʼnam genocide, livestock companies used employees and third-party hunters to hunt down the Selkʼnam to make way for estancias (large ranches).
- During the Spanish Civil War of 1936–1939, the killing practice became popular among the sons of wealthy landowners. The hunts took place on horseback and targeted landless peasants as an extension of the White Terror. They were jokingly referred to as "reforma agraria," referencing the mass grave the victims would be dumped into and the land reforms the lower classes had been attempting to attain.
- Between 1971 and 1983, serial killer Robert Hansen flew many of his victims into the Alaskan wilderness, then released them so that he could "hunt" the women with a rifle and a knife.
- There are allegations that during the siege of Sarajevo between 1992 and 1996, some "rich" foreign tourists paid the Army of Republika Srpska to take part in organized "human safaris" (Sarajevo Safari) where Serbian soldiers would take the "tourists" to various sniper positions so that they could "hunt" the local populace.
- The term human safari in the context of the Russo-Ukrainian War involves Russian soldiers deliberately targeting Ukrainian civilians in Kherson by attacking them using drones.

== In fiction ==
Blood sports have been a common theme in fiction. While historical fiction depicts real-life sports such as gladiatorial games and jousting, speculative fiction, especially dystopic science fiction, suggests variants of blood sports in a contemporary or future society. Some popular works themed on blood sports are Battle Royale, The Hunger Games, The Running Man, The Long Walk, Fight Club, Death Race 2000, Amores Perros, Squid Game, Bloodsport, and The Most Dangerous Game.

Blood sports are also a common setting for video games, going as far back as the early years of the medium itself. Games about blood sports attracted controversy from newspapers and civic organisations due to their graphic content, in particular the 1976 vehicular combat game Death Race whose game mechanic of scoring points by running over humanoid figures (marketed by Exidy as "gremlins" in their official literature) generated a moral panic. Contemporary examples such as Street Fighter, Mortal Kombat and Tekken make up much of the fighting game genre, and first-person arena shooters such as The Finals, Quake III Arena and Unreal Tournament, as well as vehicular combat games like Twisted Metal likewise depict some form of armed combat with firearms in a gladiatorial setting. Such games typically offer a laconic if not nominal plot or backstory to flesh out the characters and settings, which often take place in a large tournament attracting combatants from various locales. While Unreal Tournament and Quake III Arena do portray the game's violent combat as a "real world" blood sport within the games' fictional settings, some, such as The Finals, attempt to downplay the genre's violent themes by presenting the game as a virtual reality simulation within a fictional game show instead, devoid of any in-story human casualties. The film Battle Royale also notably inspired the battle royale genre, where players compete against each other for survival in a shrinking area, popularised by games such as PUBG: Battlegrounds (2017), Fortnite Battle Royale (2017), Apex Legends (2019), and Call of Duty: Warzone (2020).

- The Most Dangerous Game, a 1932 film about a madman hunting people shipwrecked on an isolated island and based on the "short story of the same title, spawned a "micro genre". The Predator franchise is a variation of this genre, with aliens hunting humans.
- In 2016, Daniel Wright, senior lecturer in tourism at the University of Central Lancashire, wrote a paper on the possible future of tourism where he discussed how the hunting of the poor ("hunting humans") could become a hobby of the super-rich in a future plagued by economic turmoils, ecological disasters, and global overpopulation.

== List of blood sports ==
=== Human – human ===
- Academic fencing
- Ancient Greek boxing
- Bare-knuckle boxing
- Boxing
- Slap fighting
- Calcio storico fiorentino
- Folk wrestling
- Gladiatoral spectacles
- Hardcore wrestling
- Jousting
- Kalaripayattu
- Kun Khmer
- Lethwei
- Mardani khel
- Mesoamerican ballgame
- Mixed martial arts
- Muay Boran
- Muay Thai
- Pankration
- Pasola
- Senegalese wrestling

=== Human – animal ===
- Alligator wrestling
- Buzkashi
- Bullfighting
- Cat burning
- Cock throwing
- Fox hunting
- Fox tossing
- Goose pulling
- Human-baiting
- Octopus wrestling
- Rampokan
- Steer wrestling
- Venatio

=== Animal – animal ===
- Badger-baiting
- Bear-baiting
- Betta-fighting
- Boar-baiting
- Bull-baiting
- Bull wrestling
- Camel wrestling
- Cockfighting
- Cricket fighting
- Dog fighting
- Donkey-baiting
- Duck-baiting
- Falconry
- Fox hunting
- Hare coursing
- Hog-baiting
- Hyena-baiting
- Insect fighting
- Jackal coursing
- Lion-baiting
- Monkey-baiting
- Organized horse fighting
- Ram fighting
- Rat-baiting
- Spider fighting
- Wolf-baiting

== See also ==
- Animals in sport
- Damnatio ad bestias
- Illegal sports
