= The Donkey Sanctuary =

British donkey welfare charity

Coordinates: 50.6973°N 3.1905°W

- Founded: 1969
- Founder: Elisabeth Svendsen
- Location: Sidmouth, Devon, England
- Region served: United Kingdom; Europe; Worldwide
- Method: Veterinary Care, animal sanctuaries, popular education
- Key people: Robert Crawford, Professor Jim Duncan; Stuart W. J. Reid, John Sewell-Rutter; Bill Tetlow, Cathy Thompson; Rosalind de Wesselow
- Revenue: £37m (2017)
- Website: thedonkeysanctuary.org.uk

The Donkey Sanctuary is a British charitable organisation devoted to the welfare of donkeys. The charity, which is based near Sidmouth in Devon, England, was founded in 1969. It is one of the largest equine charities in the world with an annual income and expenditure of £37 million.

== History ==
The Donkey Sanctuary was founded in 1969 by Elisabeth Svendsen. It was registered as a charity in 1973.

Svendsen was prompted to start the sanctuary following a visit to Exeter Market when she saw seven small donkeys crammed into a small pen.

By 1973 Svendsen was caring for 38 donkeys. In June 1974, she received a phone call from a solicitor who was the Executor of the Estate of the late Miss Violet Philpin who had been running the Helping Hand Animal Welfare League Donkey Sanctuary near Reading, Berkshire. The solicitor explained that Svendsen had been left a legacy of 204 donkeys. At that time, advertisements were appearing regularly in UK publications appealing for financial support for Violet Philpin's Donkey Sanctuary to the extent that the name Violet Philpin became very familiar in Britain with the care and welfare of donkeys.

After the UK Charity Commission allowed the two charities to merge, the Donkey Sanctuary purchased Slade House Farm near Sidmouth in south Devon. Since then more than 14,500 donkeys have passed through the Donkey Sanctuary's gates in the UK and Ireland. The charity operates in UK, Ireland and mainland Europe. It also conducts international operations in Africa and Asia.

In 1980 Svendsen was made an MBE for her services to animal welfare.

In 2010, the charity faced re-homing problems as a result of the recession. It made an appeal for people to volunteer to provide foster homes for its donkeys.

The Donkey Sanctuary is managed by seven trustees who are responsible for the charity, its assets and activities. In 2011, the Donkey Sanctuary founder Elisabeth Svendsen died aged 81.

== Animal welfare ==
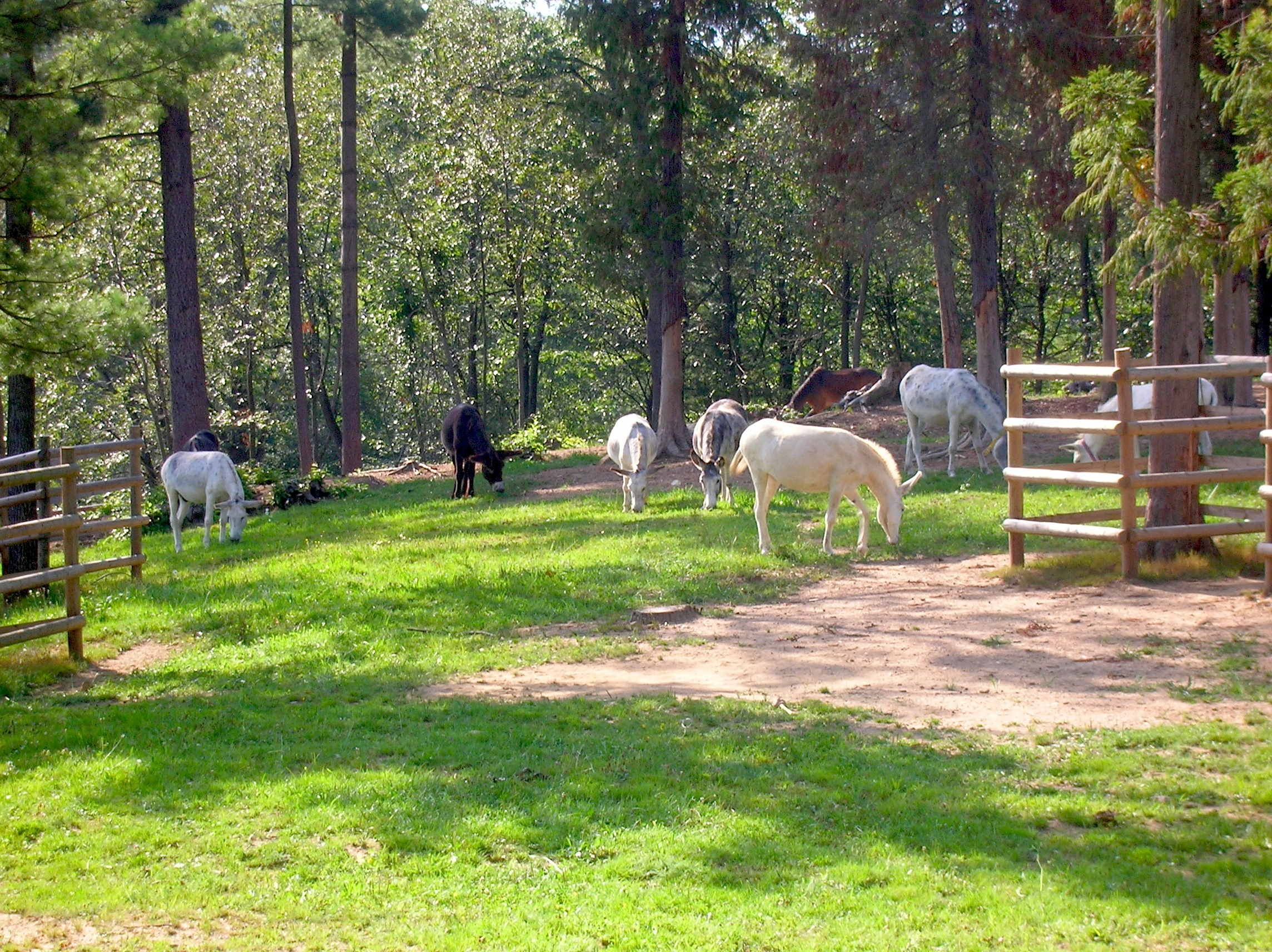
Grooming Day at the Rifugio degli Asinelli, the Italian sanctuary.

=== Europe ===
The Donkey Sanctuary also provides a permanent home to more than 4,000 donkeys. Currently there are sanctuaries, holding bases and foster homes in nine European countries: United Kingdom, Ireland, Cyprus, France, Greece, Italy, Portugal, Romania and Spain.

Many donkeys arrive at the charity because they are unwanted or have been neglected. But others are donated because of health reasons, companionship or the owner's circumstances have changed. More than 40 welfare officers offer advice and support to donkeys owners throughout the UK. They also investigate reports of cruelty or neglect, monitor markets and fairs selling equines and check the well-being of all working donkeys. As part of this work, the charity organises an annual competition to find the best beach donkeys. In 2009 the winner was the town of Filey.

=== Worldwide ===
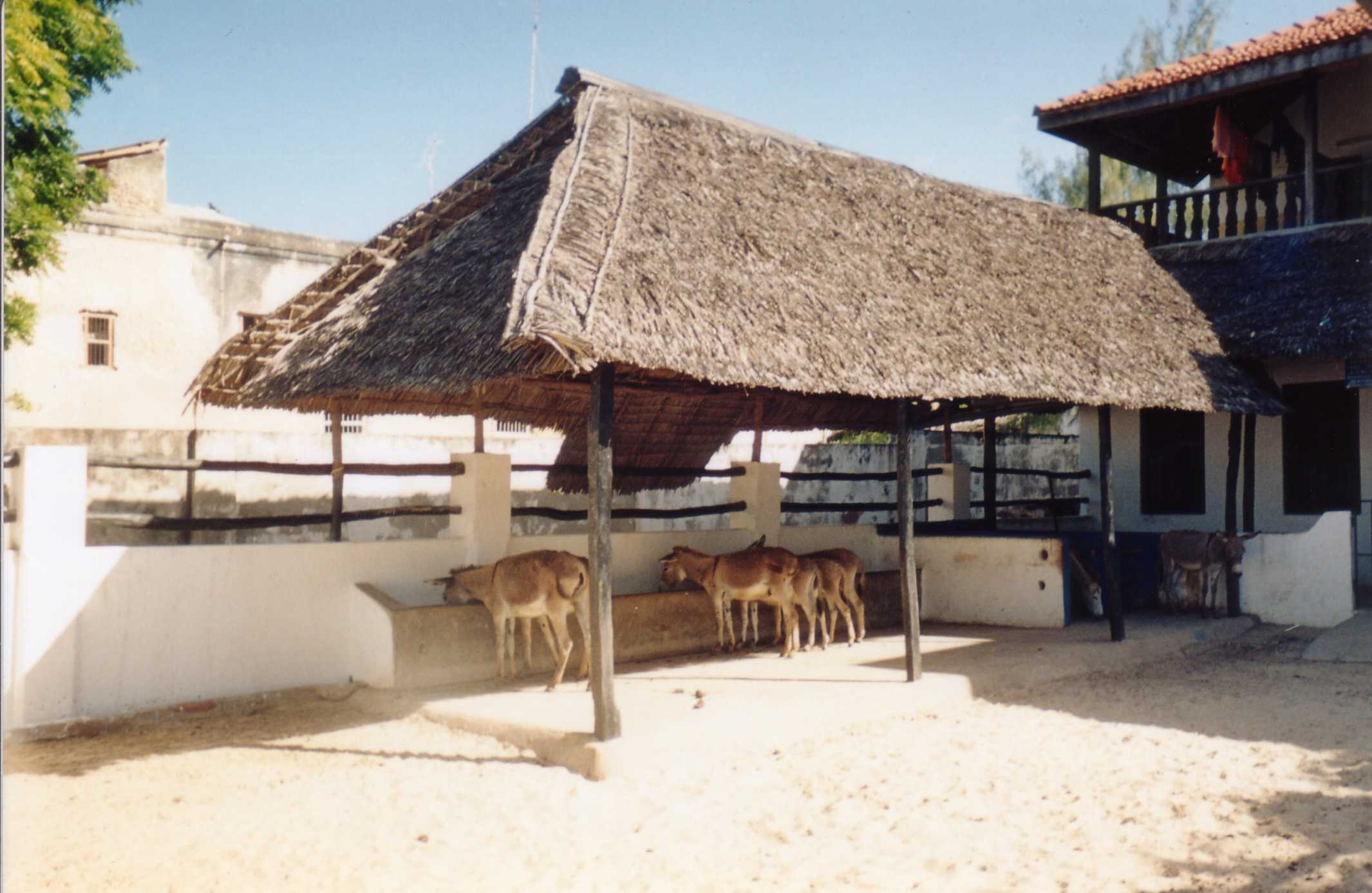
A feeding shelter, established by the Donkey Sanctuary in 1987, in Lamu, Kenya.

The sanctuary operates major projects in Egypt, Ethiopia, India, Kenya, and Mexico. Support in these countries includes free mobile veterinary clinics and education for donkey owners, children and veterinary surgeons and students. By funding local teams including veterinary surgeons and education officers, the charity administered over 300,000 treatments to working donkeys annually.

During their visit to a mobile clinic, the donkeys are given a full health check. Their teeth and hooves are tended and wounds are treated. Free advice and support is also given to their owners. Mobile clinics are fully equipped with all the veterinary supplies needed to treat most donkeys on-site.

Common problems for donkeys arriving at the clinics include signs of exhaustion, malnutrition and ailments of the teeth and feet. Donkeys may also be infested with worms or lice or have open wounds caused by poor harnessing or whipping. Injuries from road traffic accidents are also increasingly common and in some areas, terrible wounds can be inflicted by packs of dogs or hyenas, particularly to young foals. In Egypt, Ethiopia, India, Kenya and Mexico, the Donkey Sanctuary provides services in remote areas with high donkey populations.

== International Donkey Week ==
Every year The Donkey Sanctuary hosts International Donkey Week with a week-long programme of activities.

== Educational work ==
The charity trains vets, vet students and animal health assistants within project countries to improve the treatment given to donkeys. Its book The Professional Handbook of the Donkey is sent to vets throughout the world. Overseas teams have also developed a children's donkey welfare education programme that includes puppet shows, talks, cartoon sheets and story books. Its purpose is to make children learn more about the basic welfare and needs of donkeys.

== Donkey Assisted Activities ==
In 1989 the Elisabeth Svendsen Trust for Children and Donkeys was established to assist children with special needs lead a fuller life through interaction with donkeys. In August 2012, the trust merged with The Donkey Sanctuary, allowing the charity to expand its services while reducing administrative costs.

Following the merger, the charity has adopted the term Donkey Assisted Activities (DAA) to encompass its programmes, which include Donkey Facilitated Learning, Donkey Management Programme, and Wellbeing With Donkeys. These programmes are offered at the sanctuary in Sidmouth, Devon, and cater to diverse clients, such as individuals with dementia, armed forces veterans, and staff from other charities.

== Slade House Farm ==
The main headquarters of the Donkey Sanctuary in Devon is open to the public 365 days a year from 9.00am to dusk with free admission and parking. The charity estimates that more than 200,000 people visited the site in 2009. Donkeys of all ages live at the farm but a large percentage are elderly animals that remain there in order to be close to the veterinary hospital.

In 2009 a film entitled The Donkey Sanctuary, 40 years on... was produced and narrated by Elisabeth Svendsen.

== See also ==
- The Donkey Sanctuary of Canada
