= Elisabeth Svendsen =

British animal welfare advocate (1930 – 2011)

Elisabeth Doreen Svendsen
- Born: Elisabeth Doreen Knowles; 23 January 1930
- Died: 11 May 2011 (aged 81)
- Occupation: Animal welfare advocate

Elisabeth Doreen Svendsen MBE (23 January 1930 – 11 May 2011) was a British animal welfare advocate and former hotelier. Svendsen founded The Donkey Sanctuary, an animal sanctuary headquartered in Sidmouth, England, in 1969 to help abused or homeless donkeys. She also founded a related charity, the Elisabeth Svendsen Trust for Children and Donkeys, located in Ivybridge, during the 1970s.

== Early and personal life ==
Svendsen was born Elisabeth Doreen Knowles in Yorkshire on 23 January 1930. She spent her early career as a teacher and secretary. She then married Niels Svendsen and had four children – Clive, Lise, Sarah and Paul. Together, the couple invented a dryer specifically to dry cloth baby diapers. They sold the rights to their invention to a manufacturer and used their payment to purchase a hotel in Devon in 1966. Elisabeth and Niels later divorced.

== Animal advocacy ==
In 1969, Svendsen, a lifelong donkey enthusiast, bought her first donkey, named Naughty Face. Soon afterwards, Svendsen noticed seven neglected donkeys housed in a small livestock pen in a market in Exeter. She tried unsuccessfully to purchase the donkey in the worst condition of the group.

The experience of the neglected donkeys in Exeter led Svendsen to establish The Donkey Sanctuary in 1969. She began taking in elderly and disabled donkeys. She became responsible for the care of thirty-eight donkeys by 1973, an expensive undertaking. She was contacted in June 1974 by a lawyer for a late elderly woman named Violet Philpin, who had bequeathed Svendsen 204 donkeys. Svendsen gave up her hotel to work with The Donkey Sanctuary full-time.

The Donkey Sanctuary, founded by Svendsen and headquartered in Sidmouth, Devon, has cared for more than 14,500 donkeys as of 2011. The sanctuary, which now has a veterinary hospital and overnight accommodations, employs approximately 500 people worldwide, including sixty in the United Kingdom who investigate reports of abused donkeys. Svendsen expanded the sanctuary to Latin America, Asia and Africa. She founded a donkey hospital with emergency room in Ethiopia, where the lifespan of a donkey is just nine years. Mobile donkey clinics have also been dispatched in Mexico, Kenya and India.

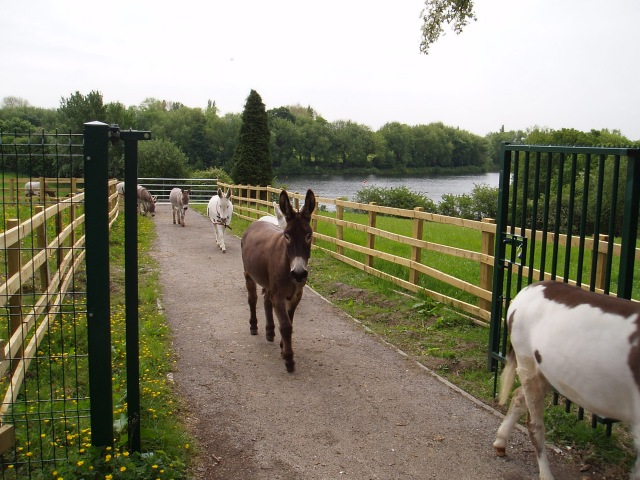
Donkeys at the Elisabeth Svendsen Trust for Children and Donkeys in 2007

Svendsen established a sister charity to the Donkey Sanctuary, called the Elisabeth Svendsen Trust for Children and Donkeys, during the mid-1970s. The trust provides riding therapy between donkeys and children with special needs. During her career, Svendsen authored more than twelve books, including two autobiographies, Down Among the Donkeys in 1981 and For the Love of Donkeys in 1993, as well as a series of children's books.

Svendsen became a Member of the Order of the British Empire in 1980. In 2001, the Royal Society for the Prevention of Cruelty to Animals awarded her with the Lord Erskine Award.

== Later life and death ==
Svendsen retired from full-time work in 2007. In April 2011, Elisabeth Svendsen named an orphaned donkey foal after Prince William in honour of the Prince's upcoming wedding to Catherine Middleton. The foal had arrived at the Donkey Sanctuary on 9 April after its mother was unable to care for him. Svendsen said at the time, "It's a real honour to have Prince William with us and I can't think of a better name for him, thus to mark the occasion of the royal wedding."

Elisabeth Svendsen died at her home on 11 May 2011, after suffering a stroke at the age of 81. She was survived by her four children—Clive, Lise, Sarah and Paul; eight grandchildren; and two great-grandchildren.
