= Lion-baiting =

Blood sport

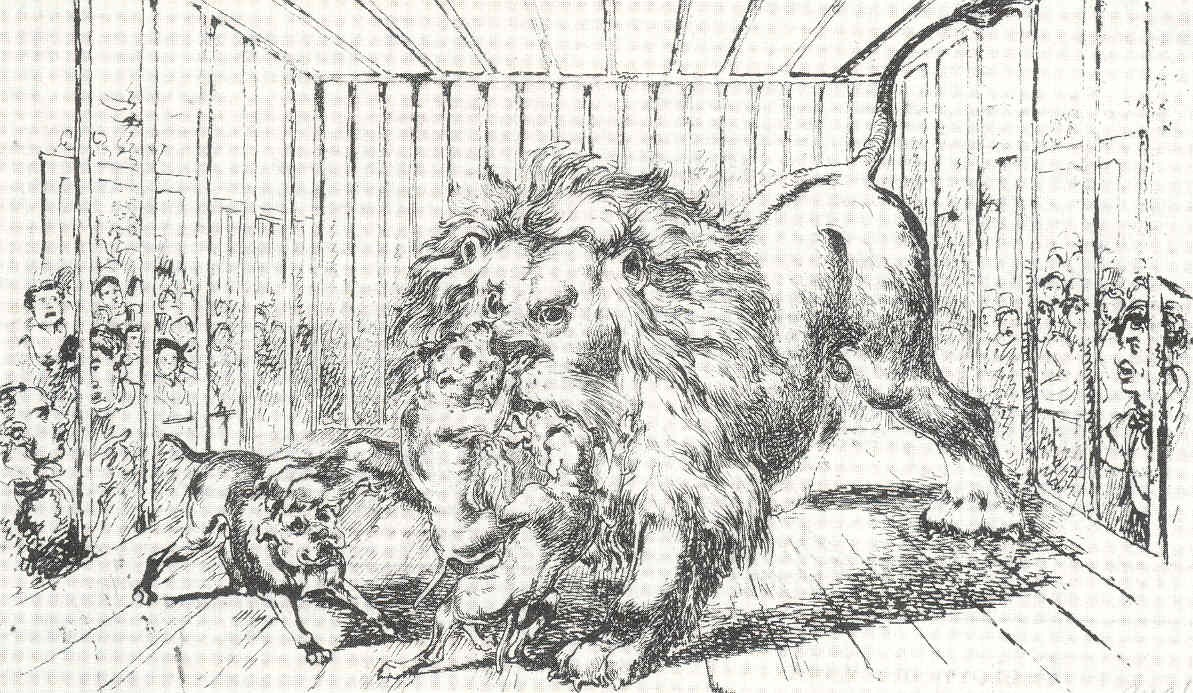
Lion-bait at Warwick between Wallace and dogs, Tinker and Ball, circa 1827.

Lion-baiting is a blood sport involving the baiting of lions against dogs.

== Antiquity ==
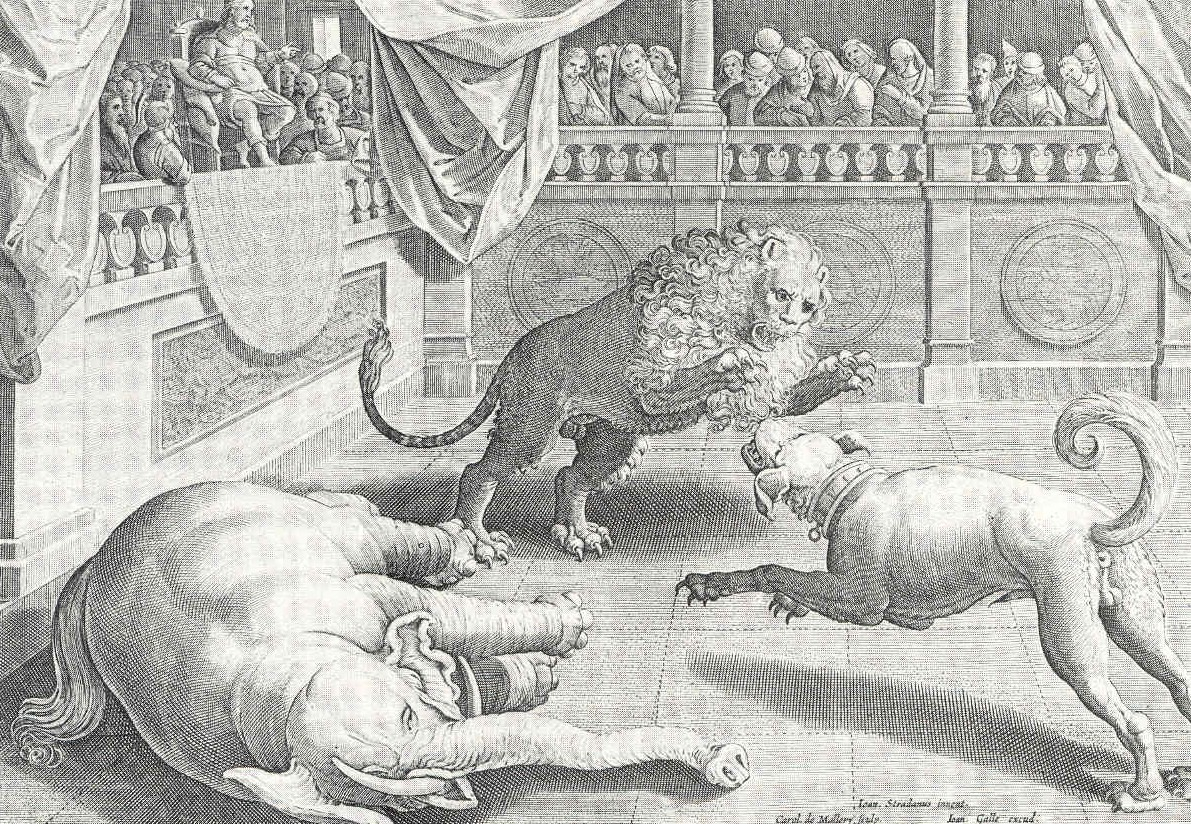
Alexander the Great

Antiquity has examples where groups of dogs defeat the 'king of beasts', the lion. Greek legend reflects Achilles' shield with the depiction of a fight of his dog against two lions. A second is a report that Cambyses II of the Achaemenid Empire possessed a dog that started a fight with two full-grown lions. A third, is reported by a Roman historian, Claudius Aelianus, in which he states Indians showed Alexander the Great powerful dogs bred for lion-baiting. Certainly, ancient historians would embellish and exaggerate their stories, but they do capture the spirit of dog versus lion.

== Europe ==
=== 17th century ===
In 1610, during the reign of James I of England the practice of lion-baiting was first recorded. The spectacle was staged for the amusement of the court. The King requested Edward Alleyn, Master of the Beargarden, to acquire the three largest and most courageous dogs. The event was as follows:

"One of the dogs, which was the first to be sent in the cage, was soon put out of action by the lion, which seized it by the head and neck and dragged it through the cage. A second dog was sent in and met with the same fate. The third, however, which came to its aid, immediately seized the lion by the lower jaw and gripped it securely for a considerable time until, severely injured by the lion's claws, it was forced to loosen its grip. The lion itself was injured in the fight and did not wish to continue fighting. With a sudden mighty leap over the dogs, it fled inside its den. Two of the dogs died shortly after the fight from the injuries they had suffered. The last, however, survived this splendid fight and was nursed back to health with great care by the King's son, Henry Frederick, Prince of Wales. Prince Henry declared: 'He had fought the king of the wild animals and should never again have to fight baser creatures!' In this way, the dog had gained for itself a safe life at the English Royal court."

=== 18th century ===
Cane Corsos

In 1790, The Times reported a lion-baiting in Vienna as follows:

"There was a lion fight at the amphitheatre of Vienna, in the summer of 1790, which was almost the last permitted in that capital. The amphitheatre at Vienna embraced an area of from eighty to a hundred feet in diameter. The lower part of the structure comprised the dens of the different animals. Above those dens, and about ten feet from the ground, were the first and principal seats, over which were galleries. In the course of the entertainment, a den was opened, out of which stalked, in free and ample range, a most majestic lion; and, soon after, a fallow deer was let into the circus from another den. The deer instantly fled, and bounded round the circular space, pursued by the lion; but the quick and sudden turnings of the former continually baulked the effort of its pursuer. After this ineffectual chase had continued for several minutes, a door was opened, through which the deer escaped; and presently five or six of the large and fierce Hungarian Mastiffs were sent in. The lion, at the moment of their entrance, was leisurely returning to his den, the door of which stood open. The dogs, which entered behind him, flew towards him in a body, with the utmost fury, making the amphitheatre ring with their barking. When they reached the lion, the noble animal stopped, and deliberately turned towards them. The dogs instantly retreated a few steps, increasing their vociferations, and the lion slowly resumed his progress towards his den. The dogs again approached; the lion turned his head; his adversaries halted; and this continued until, on his nearing his den, the dogs separated, and approached him on different sides. The lion then turned quickly round, like one whose dignified patience could brook the harassment of insolence no longer. The dogs fled far, as if instinctively sensible of the power of wrath they had at length provoked. One unfortunate dog, however, which had approached too near to effect his escape, was suddenly seized by the paw of the lion; and the piercing yells which he sent forth quickly caused his comrades to recede to the door of entrance at the opposite site of the area, where they stood in a row, barking and yelling in concert with their miserable associate. After arresting the struggling and yelling prisoner for a short time, the lion couched upon him with his forepaws and mouth. The struggles of the sufferer grew feebler and feebler, until at length he became perfectly motionless. We all concluded him to be dead. In this composed posture of executive justice, the lion remained for at least ten minutes, when he majestically rose, and with a slow step entered his den, and disappeared. The apparent corpse continued to lie motionless for a few minutes; presently the dog, to his amazement, and that of the whole amphitheatre, found himself alive, and rose with his nose pointed to the ground, his tail between his hind legs pressing his belly, and, as soon as he was certified of his existence, he made off for the door in a long trot, through which he escaped with his more fortunate companions."

J. March's, Zoological Anecdotes, circa 1845, has the story of a second lion-bait, which occurred in Vienna in the year 1791 as follows:

"Of late years the truth of the accounts which have been so long current, respecting the generous disposition of the lion, have been called in question. Several travellers, in their accounts of Asia and Africa, describe him as of a more rapacious and sanguinary disposition than had formerly been supposed, although few of them have had the opportunity to make him a particular object of their attention. A circumstance that occurred not long since in Vienna seems, however, to confirm the more ancient accounts. In the year 1791, at which period the custom of baiting wild beasts still existed in that city, a combat was to be exhibited between a lion and a number of large dogs. As soon as the noble animal made his appearance, four large bull-dogs were turned loose upon him, three of which, however, as soon as they came near him, took fright, and ran away. One only had courage to remain, and make the attack. The lion, however, without rising from the ground upon which he was lying, showed him, by a single stroke with his paw, how greatly his superior he was in strength; for the dog was instantly stretched motionless on the ground. The lion drew him towards him, and laid his fore-paws upon him in such a manner that only a small part of his body could be seen. Every one imagined that the dog was dead, and that the lion would soon rise and devour him. But they were mistaken. The dog began to move, and struggled to get loose, which the lion permitted him to do. He seemed merely to have warned him not to meddle with him any more; but when the dog attempted to run away, and had already got half over the enclosure, the lion's indignation seemed to be excited. He sprang from the ground, and in two leaps reached the fugitive, who had just got as far as the paling, and was whining to have it opened for him to escape. The flying animal had called the instinctive propensity of the monarch of the forest into action: the defenceless enemy now excited his pity; for the generous lion stepped a few paces backward, and looked quietly on, while a small door was opened to let the dog out of the enclosure. This unequivocal trait of generosity moved every spectator. A shout of applause resounded throughout the assembly, who had enjoyed a satisfaction of a description far superior to what they had expected. It is possible that the African lion, when, under the impulse of hunger, he goes out to seek his prey, may not so often exhibit this magnanimous disposition; for in that case he is compelled by imperious necessity to satisfy the cravings of nature; but when his appetite is satiated, he never seeks for prey, nor does he ever destroy to gratify a blood-thirsty disposition."

=== 19th century ===
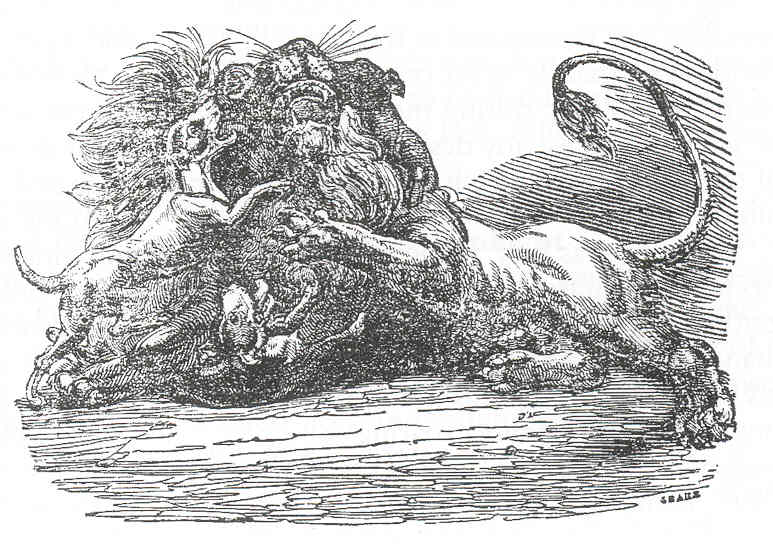
Nero

Ticket to Nero "Great Lion Fight"

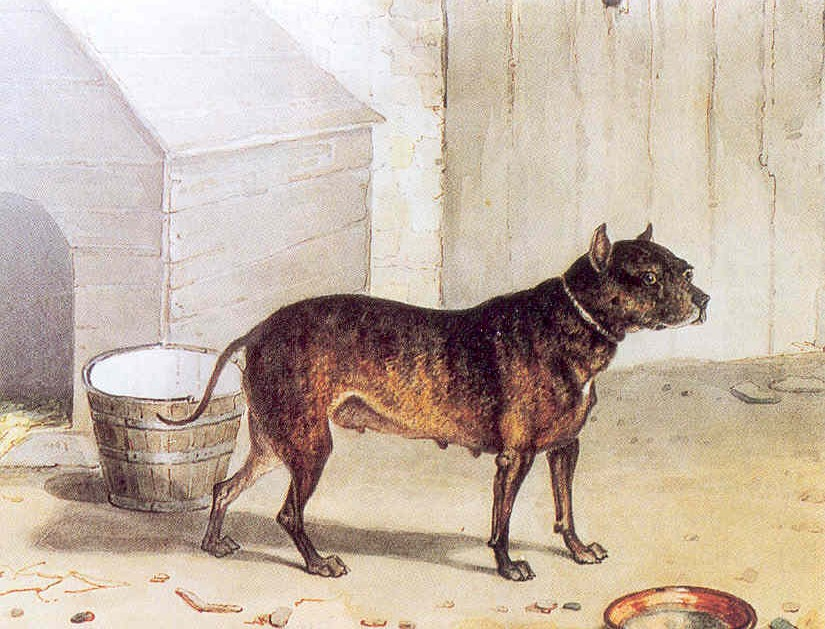
Nettel was in the second group of dogs set on Nero

In 1825, two more lion fights took place, staged by a promoter named George Wombwell, who travelled around England with his collection of caged wild animals. The fights were arranged in collaboration with dog dealers Ben White and Bill George. The cage measured fifteen feet square, ten feet high, with an elevated floor six feet from the ground. The old iron bars were wide enough apart for a dog to enter or escape. The first bait involved the lion named "Nero" and the second bait a lion named "Wallace".

The Morning Herald of 26 July 1825, provided the following account:

The lion's travelling caravan was drawn close to the fighting cage, so that the door could be opened from one into the other; and the keeper, Wombwell, then going into the travelling caravan, in which another man had already been staying with the lion for some time, the animal followed him into the cage as tamely as a Newfoundland dog. The whole demeanour of the beast, indeed, was so quiet and generous, that at his first appearance, it became very much doubted whether he would attempt to fight at all. While the multitude shouted and the dogs were yelling in the ground below, he walked up and down his cage with the most perfect composure, not at all angered, or even excited.

In the meantime, Wombwell had quit the cage and the dogs were 'made ready'. These were the fallow-coloured Old English Bulldog, a brown with white legs and a third brown altogether averaging about forty pounds in weight a piece and described in the printed papers, which were distributed by the names 'Captain', 'Tiger' and 'Turk'. As the dogs were held for a minute in slips, upon which they ran from the ground to the stage, the lion crouched on his belly to receive them; but, with so perfect an absence of anything like ferocity, showed clearly that the idea of fighting, or doing mischief to any living creature, never had occurred to him.

At the first rush of the dogs, which the lion evidently had not expected and did not at all know how to meet, they all fixed themselves upon him, but caught only by the dewlap and the mane. With a single effort he shook them off, without attempting to return the attack. He then flew from side to side of the cage, endeavouring to get away; but in the next moment the assailants were upon him again, and the brown dog, Turk, seized him by the nose, while the two others fastened at the same time on the fleshy part of his lips and under-jaw. The lion then roared dreadfully, but evidently only from the pain he suffered, not at all from anger. As the dogs hung to his throat and head, he pawed them off by sheer strength; and in doing this and in rolling upon them, did them considerably mischief; but it amounted to the most curious fact that he never once bit, or attempted to bite, during the whole contest, or seemed to have any desire to retaliate any of the punishment which was inflicted upon him.

When he was first 'pinned', for instance, the dogs hung to him for more than a minute and were drawn, holding to his nose and lips, several times round the ring. After a short time, roaring tremendously, he tore them off with his claws, mauling two a good deal in the operation, but still not attempting afterward to act on the offensive. After about five minutes fighting, the fallow-coloured dog was taken away, lame and apparently much distressed and the remaining two continued the combat alone, the lion still working only with his paws, as though seeking to rid himself of a torture, the nature of which he did not well understand. In two or three minutes more, the second dog, Tiger, being dreadfully maimed, crawled out of the business; not the brown dog, Turk, which was the lightest of the three, but was of admirable courage and went on fighting by himself.

A most extraordinary scene ensued; dog, left entirely alone with an animal twenty time its weight, continued the battle with unabated fury and though bleeding all over from the effect of the lion's claws, seized and pinned him by the nose at least half a dozen times; when, at length, releasing himself with a desperate effort, the lion flung his whole weight upon the dog and held him lying between his fore paws for more than a minute, during which time he could have bitten his head off a hundred times over, but did not make the slightest effort to hurt him. Poor Turk was then taken away by the dog-keepers, grievously mangled but still alive and seized the lion, for at least the twentieth time, the very same moment that he was released from under him.

The second round of the contest presented only a repetition of the first. However, the second set of dogs being heavier than the first and the lion more exhausted, it became a one-way contest. Nero, bleeding freely from the nose and head, was unable to keep his footing and slipped on the wet boards. The dogs, all three, seized him; the lion endeavoured to get rid of them in the same way as before, using his pawn and not thinking of fighting, but not with the same success. He fell and showed symptoms of weakness, upon which the dogs were taken away. This termination, however, did not please the crowd, who cried out loudly that the dogs were not beaten.

Some confusion then followed; after which the doges were again put in and again seized the lion, which by this time, as well as bleeding freely from the head appeared to have hurt one of his fore feet. Nero weakened rapidly, Mr. Wombwell announced that he gave on the part of the lion; and the exhibition was declared to at an end. The first round lasting eleven minutes with the second less than five. From the beginning of the contest to the end, the lion was merely a sufferer; he never struck a blow in anger.

— The Morning Herald, 26 July 1825

==== Wallace ====
Wallace makes short work of the dogs

Wombwell, in the same week, submitted another of his lions to be baited and this match proved to be a very different proposition for the dogs. The Times gave an account of the contest as follows:

"Wombwell has, notwithstanding the public indignation which accompanied the exposure of the lion Nero to the six dogs, kept his word with the lovers of cruel sports by a second exhibition. He matched his 'Wallace,' a fine lion, cubbed in Scotland, against six of the best dogs that could be found. Wallace's temper is the very opposite of that of the gentle Nero. It is but seldom that he lets even his feeders approach him, and he soon shows that he cannot reconcile himself to familiarity from any creature not of his own species. Towards eight o'clock the factory-yard was well attended, at 5s. each person, and soon after the battle commenced. The lion was turned from his den to the same stage on which Nero fought. The match was—1st. Three couples of dogs to be slipped at him, two at a time—2d. Twenty minutes or more, as the umpires should think fit, to be allowed between each attack—3d. The dogs to be handed to the cage once only. Tinker, Ball, Billy, Sweep, Turpin, Tiger.

In the first round, Tinker and Ball were let loose, and both made a gallant attack; the lion having waited for them as if aware of the approach of his foes. He showed himself a forest lion, and fought like one. He clapped his paw upon poor Ball, took Tinker in his teeth, and deliberately walked round the stage with him as a cat would with a mouse. Ball, released from the paw, worked all he could, but Wallace treated his slight punishment by a kick now and then. He at length dropped Tinker, and that poor animal crawled off the stage as well as he could. The lion then seized Ball by the mouth, and played precisely the same game with him as if he had actually been trained to it. Ball would have been almost devoured, but his second got hold of him through the bars, and hauled him away. Turpin, a London, and Sweep, a Liverpool dog, made an excellent attack, but it was three or four minutes before the ingenuity of their seconds could get them on. Wallace squatted on his haunches, and placed himself erect at the slope where the dogs mounted the stage, as if he thought they dared not approach. The dogs, when on, fought gallantly; but both were vanquished in less than a minute after their attack. The London dog bolted as soon as he could extricate himself from the lion's grasp, but Sweep would have been killed on the spot, but he was released. Wedgbury untied Billy and Tiger, casting a most piteous look upon the wounded dogs around him. Both went to work. Wallace seized Billy by the loins, and when shaking him, Tiger having run away, Wedgbury cried out, 'There, you see how you've gammoned me to have the best dog in England killed.' Billy, however, escaped with his life; he was dragged through the railing, after having received a mark in the loins, which (if he recovers at all) will probably render him unfit for any future contest. The victory of course was declared in favour of the lion. Several well-dressed women viewed the contest from the upper apartment of the factory.

— The Times

Wallace was the first African lion to be bred in the UK, having been born in Edinburgh in 1812. He was probably named after Scottish fighter William Wallace. He died in 1838, and his stuffed body placed in the museum in Saffron Walden, Essex. When in 1930, Marriott Edgar wrote his humorous monologue The Lion and Albert, he called the lion "Wallace".

=== Outrage ===
The public were outraged at the promotion of such baiting spectacles and the matter was raised in the Parliament of the United Kingdom. Wombwell's lion baits were the last to be staged in the United Kingdom.

== See also ==
- History of lions in Europe
