= Wolf-baiting =

Blood sport between wolves and dogs

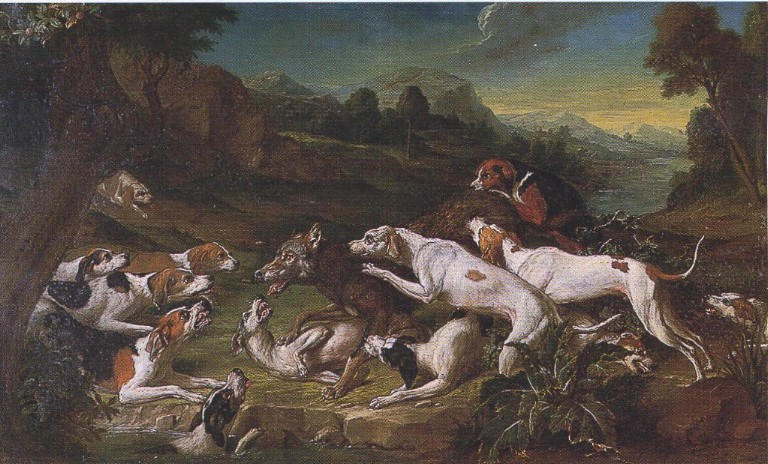
18th-century painting by Gerard Rijsbrack

Wolf-baiting is a blood sport involving the baiting of wolves against dogs.

Historically, the baiting of wolves was more in the context of training dogs for wolf hunting than public entertainment. Wolves would sometimes be caught, either at the end of hunts, or in set traps, and would be set upon by the dogs, usually as a way of helping them master their fear of the animal. When training young or inexperienced dogs, the wolf would be hamstrung. Accounts as to how wolves react to being attacked by dogs vary, though John James Audubon wrote that young wolves generally show submissive behaviour, while older wolves fight savagely.

Sculpture of a Dogue de Bordeaux fighting a wolf from the Muséum national d'histoire naturelle

One of the earliest recorded incidents of wolf-baiting occurred during one of the Roman civil wars. The Dacians, hoping to take advantage of Rome's division, pressed their chieftain Scorlyo to launch an offensive. Scorlyo brought several dogs to the city square, which immediately began fighting one another. However, a captured wolf was brought in, to which the dogs ceased their fighting and attacked it. By this, Scorlyo intended to teach his people that whatever war a nation had within itself, it would always stand firm in attacking an outsider. However, wolves can be extremely dangerous opponents for dogs, even when outnumbered. French King Louis XIII once acquired an old wolf and set his best dogs on it three at a time. The wolf managed to kill twelve of them without sustaining any serious injury. The fighting styles of wolves and dogs differ significantly; while dogs typically limit themselves to attacking the head, neck and shoulder, wolves will make greater use of body blocks, and attack the extremities of their opponents. Theodore Roosevelt once wrote that he considered a large mastiff a match for a wolf only if the latter was a young or undersized Texas wolf, though he conceded that even if the dog was the heavier of the two, its teeth and claws would be very much smaller, weaker and its hide less tough.

== See also ==
- Wolf hunting with dogs
- White Fang
