= Human-baiting =

Blood sport

Human-baiting is a blood sport involving the baiting of humans against dogs. There are at least three known documented cases of human-baiting, all of which occurred in England in the 19th century.

== Gentleman and the Bull Dog ==
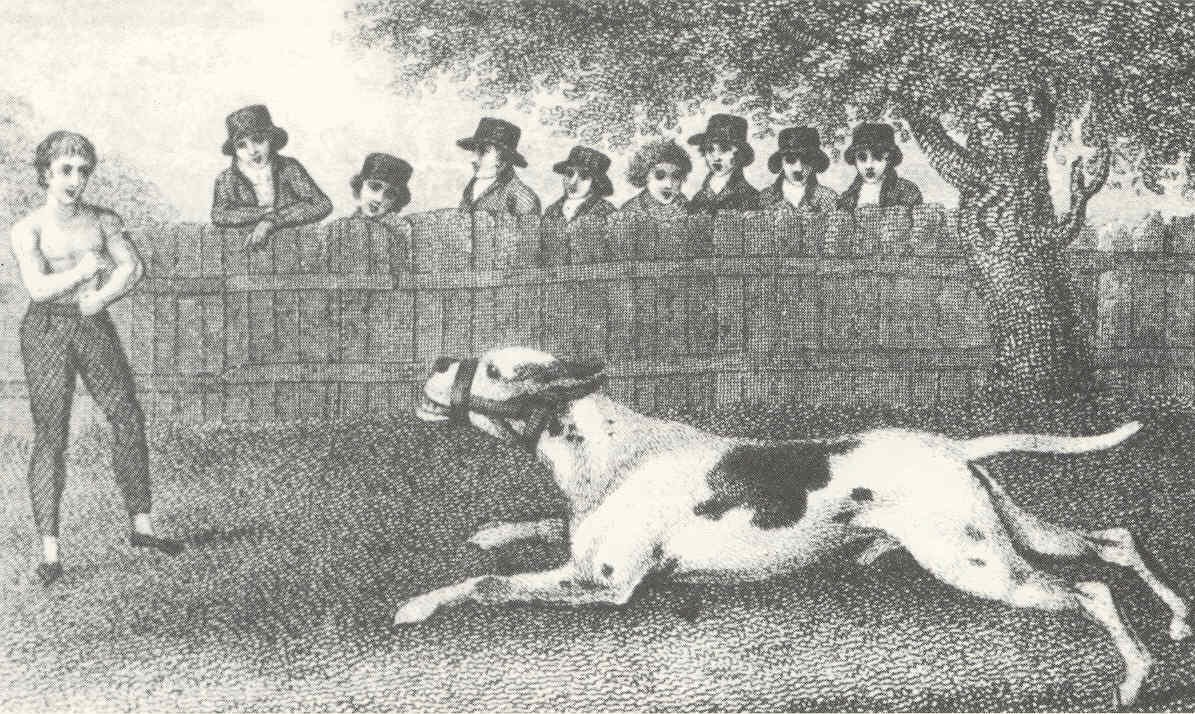
Gentleman and the Bulldog (circa 1807)

The Sporting Magazine, vol. XVIII, documented a fight between parties labeled simply the Gentleman and the Bull Dog. The Sporting Times also reported on this fight, which occurred in 1807. The story illustrates the outcome of a large, mastiff-like dog charging its opponent. Despite the handicap of a muzzle, the dog was the winner.

A fight between a man and Bull Dog took place some time ago to settle a bet. With its first charge the Bull Dog already succeeded in throwing and pinning its opponent. Although the dog's jaws were nearly closed by a muzzle, it succeeded in sinking its teeth into the man's body. Had the dog not been pulled away immediately, it would have disemboweled the man.

== Physic versus Brummy ==
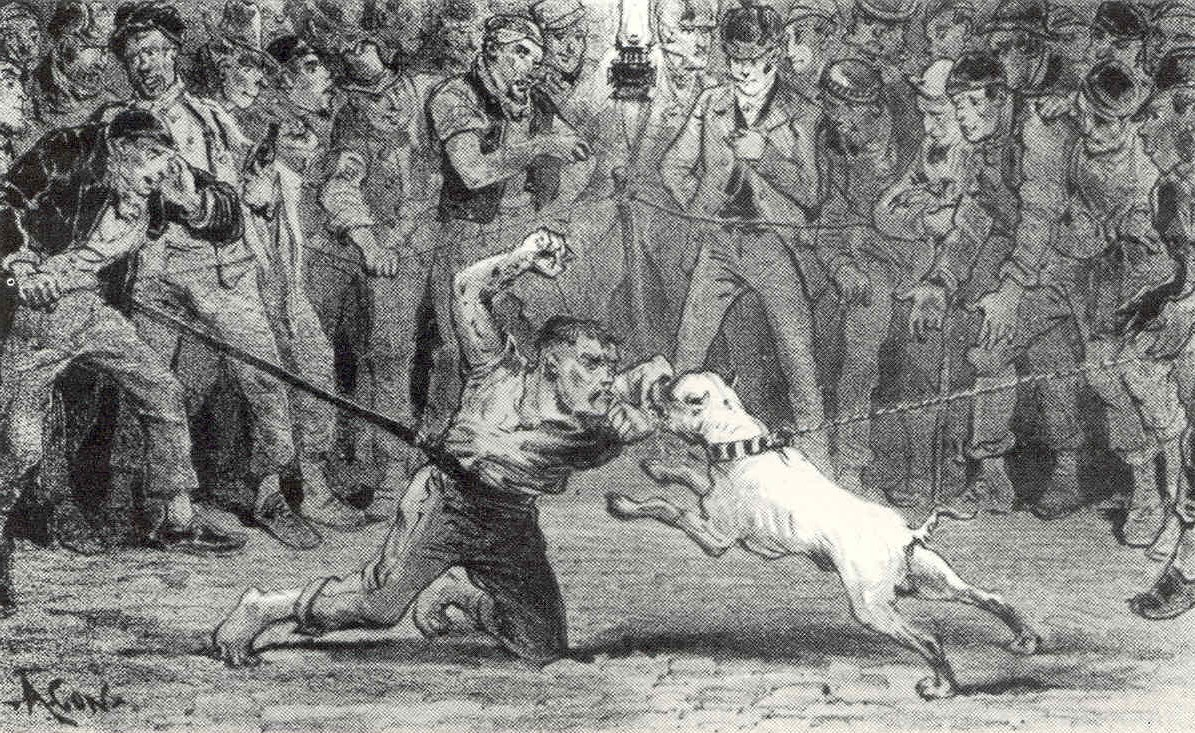
Physic and Brummy, An Evening at Hanley

On 6 July 1874 the Daily Telegraph published an article, written by James Greenwood, in which he reported on 25 June 1874 to have witnessed a fight between a man and a dog. Greenwood recounted the tale in his 1876 book, Low-Life Deeps, in the chapter called "In the Potteries". On July 11, 1874, The Spectator published an article called The Dog-Fight at Hanley that described the circumstances of the brawl.

The fighter, named Brummy, was a middle-aged dwarf about 4.5 feet (1.4 m) tall, with oversized features, and bowed legs. He had apparently agreed to fight the dog for a bet, on his theory that no dog "could lick a man". His opponent was a white bulldog named Physic. Held by its guardian, the dog apparently did not bark, but was excited to the point where tears ran from its eyes. The fight, watched by an audience of about 50, occurred at an old inn at Hanley, Staffordshire, in a large guest room, its windows closed and its floor covered in sawdust, with the ring cordoned off by a line.

During the fight Brummy was bitten deeply several times on his arms, and the Bulldog was dealt several heavy blows to the head and ribs. After ten rounds the Bulldog's head was heavily swollen, it had lost two teeth, and one of its eyes was closed. The fight lasted until round eleven when Brummy knocked the dog out.

This story was reported on by The New York Times, which stated that the story is probably false, though noting that the Daily Telegraph insisted on its veracity.

== East End Club ==
In 1892, another human-baiting occurred between the human combatant James Oxley and a fighting dog named Crib. The following is extracted from a contemporary report:

An arbite (man and dog fight) took place in an East End Club. The match was that James Oxley, a man well known in the neighbourhood of Shoreditch, would stall off for thirty-minutes a fighting dog called 'Crib' owned by Robert Green. The match came off not many yards from the Britannia Theatre, Hoxton and excited considerable interest amongst those in the know. Some of the prominent people, who brought about this sickening match, when interviewed, stated that for twenty-one minutes Oxley kept the dog off by using his fists. But, at one moment, the dog made a desperate effort to get past the man's guard and did and jumped over his left shoulder, wheeled round and fastened on the man's right ear, and dragged him to the ground. As soon as it was possible, the dog was choked off, but the upper part of Oxley's ear had disappeared.

== See also ==
- Venatio
