= Badger-baiting =

Blood sport

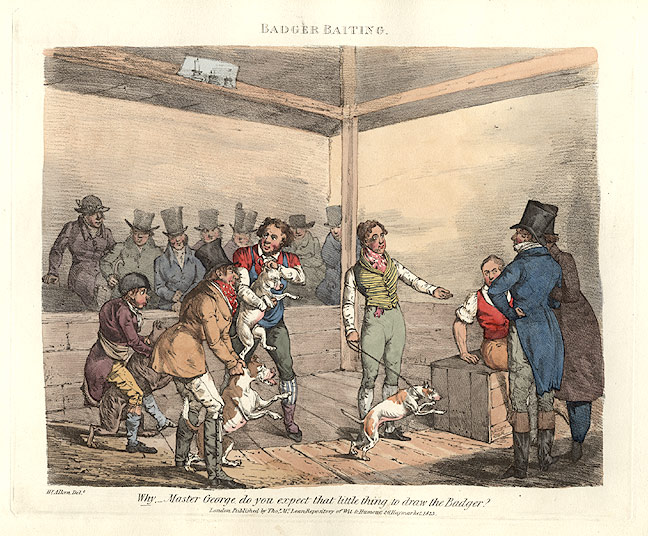
Badger drawing

Badger-baiting is a form of blood sport in which badgers are baited with dogs. A baiting session typically results in the death of the badger, and possibly serious injuries to the dogs.

== Background ==
"A Match at the Badger" by Henry Thomas Alken circa 1820

The badger is a usually quiet and docile creature in its own domain; however, when cornered or threatened it can show great courage. Weighing up to 35 pounds (15 kg) when fully grown, the badger has an extraordinarily dangerous bite, which it is willing to use when threatened. In addition, badgers have extremely powerful claws, used for digging in hard earth, which are more than capable of injuring a dog. A formidable adversary for any dog, the badger was a sought-after victim for the fighting pit.

== Drawing the badger ==
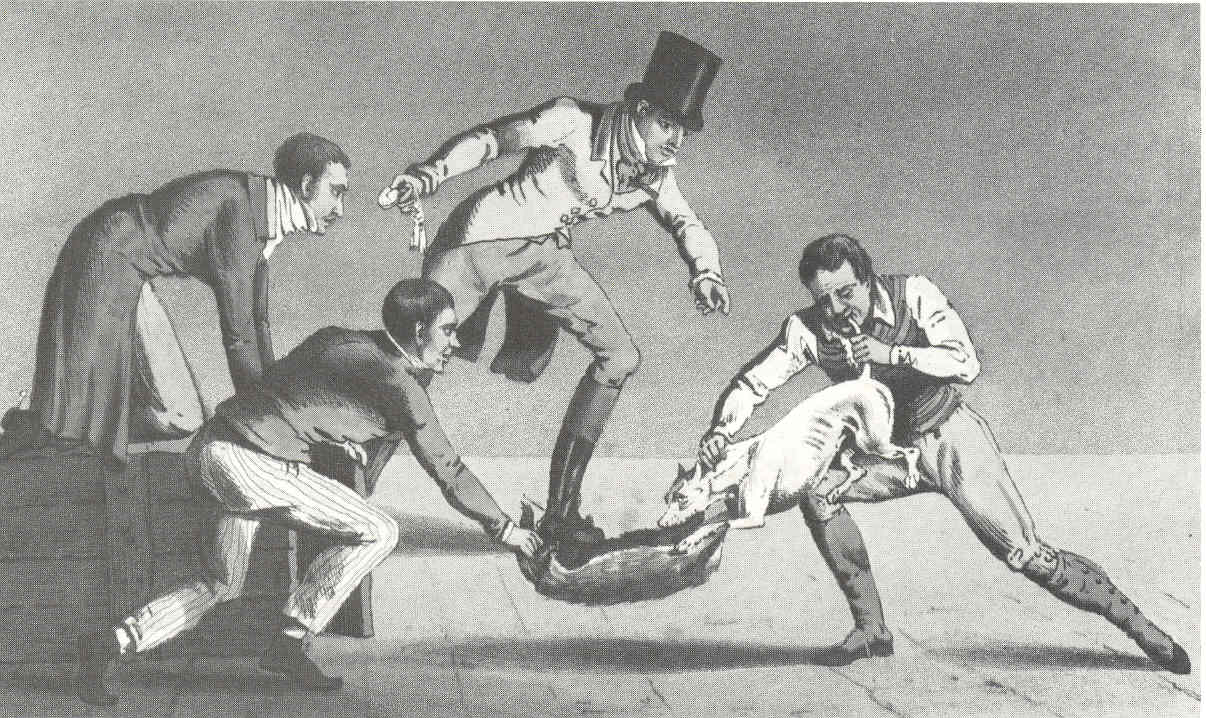
"Drawing the Badger" by Henry Thomas Alken circa 1820

In order to use the badger's ability to defend itself to test the dog, artificial badger dens were built, captured badgers were put in them and then the dog was set on the badger. The badger would be placed in a box, which was furnished in imitation of its den and from which a tunnel led upward. The owner of the badger puts his animal in the box.

The timekeeper is equipped with a watch and the badger's owner releases the dog for the fight. Whoever wants to pit his dog against the badger lets it slide into the tunnel. Usually the dog is seized immediately by the badger and the dog in turn grips the badger. Each bites, tears and pulls the other with all their might. The owner of the dog quickly pulls out the dog whose jaws are clamped obstinately onto the badger by its tail. The two are separated and the badger is returned to its den. Then the dog is sent back in to seize the badger and it again is drawn out with the badger. This scene is repeated over and over again. The more often a dog is able to seize the badger within a minute, so that both can be pulled out together, the more it is up to the task and is considered game.

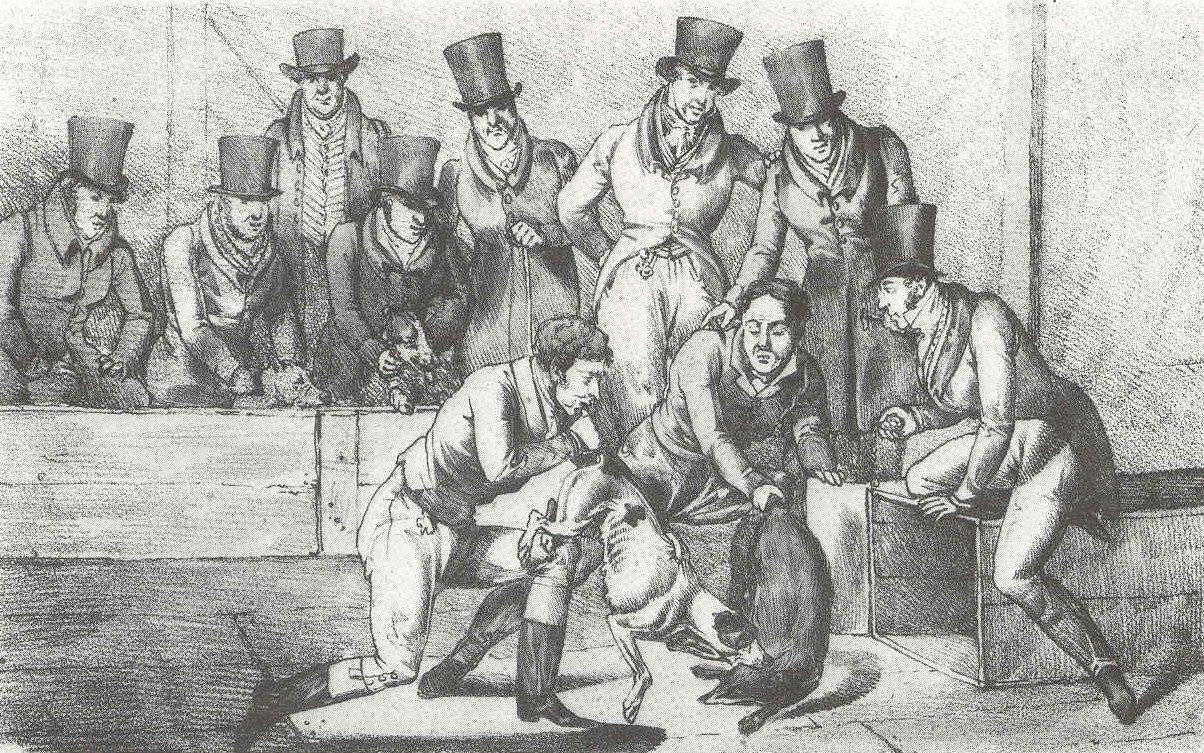
"Badger Baiting" by Henry Thomas Alken circa 1824

Drawing the badger came to England in the 18th century and soon became a very popular sideshow in the pit. It provided a new opportunity to win or lose money by betting. Drawing the badger thus became a permanent part of the fight in the pit. Baits were staged outside the pit in cellars or taverns, as an interesting attraction for the guests.

Towards the middle of the 19th century, badger-baiting declined in popularity to be replaced by dog fighting.

== Badger dogs ==
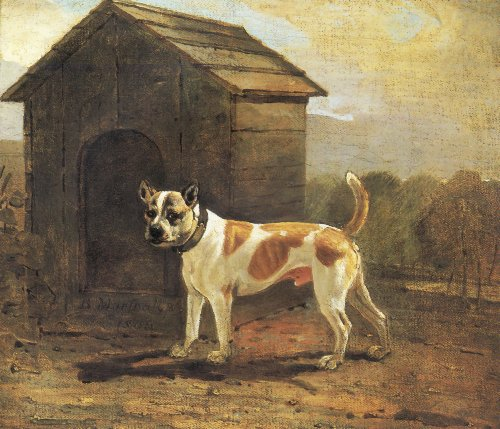
Dustman, a bull and terrier dog used for badger-baiting. Sporting Magazine, 1812.

Some dog breeds were specifically developed for badger-baiting whilst several other breeds were used in this task in addition to more general vermin control; breeds include the Dachshund and terriers like the bull and terrier and the Jack Russell Terrier.

== Animal cruelty ==
Apart from the cruelty towards badgers, dogs are also brutalized in the blood sport. Dogs usually suffer injuries to the face and neck. In some cases, the injuries are such that the dogs must be euthanized.

Today, baiters often refrain from taking injured dogs to veterinarians as the doctor might understand what has taken place and report the owners to the police. For this reason the badger is often crippled and/or restrained to minimise the risk of injury to dogs. The badger's long front claws may be filed off; the canine teeth may be pulled out; the animal's limbs or jaw may be broken with a shovel. To inhibit the badger's movement, there are rumours that the tendons in its hind legs may be cut. Griffiths et al. mention nailing badgers to the ground by the tail.

When the badger can no longer fight, it is killed by the baiters using methods such as shooting, stabbing, or beating to death with a shovel. Dead badgers are sometimes dumped by the roadside to be mistaken for roadkill.

== Legal standing ==
Badger baiting was outlawed in the United Kingdom as early as 1835, with the Cruelty to Animals Act. The practice of baiting of animals is now specifically forbidden under the Protection of Animals Act 1911. Furthermore, the cruelty towards and killing of the badger constitutes an offence under the Protection of Badgers Act 1992 and further offences under this act are inevitably committed to facilitate badger-baiting, including interfering with a sett, or the taking or the very possession of a badger for purposes other than nursing an injured animal to health. If convicted, a person may face a sentence of up to six months in prison, a fine of up to £5,000 and other punitive measures, including, but not limited to: community service and a ban from owning a dog.

In the Republic of Ireland, badgers and their setts are protected under the Wildlife Act 1976 and Wildlife Amendment Act 2000.

== Modern times ==
Despite having been illegal for over 180 years, badger-baiting has continued in a clandestine manner throughout Britain and Ireland until the present day. In February 2009, The Sunday Times reported that badger-baiting is practised by "hardcore terrier men" who are internationally organized. The Sunday Times has also reported that there is little attention on the part of the Irish government towards animal cruelty in general. The report led to a police operation in Northern Ireland in which a number of dogs were seized, but no arrests were made.

In the Republic of Ireland the NPWS has secured ten convictions for the illegal persecution of badgers in the last 20 years.

In 2009, badger baiting was believed to be on the rise according to animal welfare organizations. Badger-baiting is often linked to other criminal activities, and some practitioners brag on social networks about their deeds.

In 2018, David Thomas of North Wales was sentenced to 22 weeks and his accomplice to 20 for setting dogs on badgers.

Criminal gangs, among them Northern Irish paramilitaries, have been reported to sell badgers for up to £700 to fight with dogs.

== See also ==
- Bull-baiting
- Bear-baiting
