= Baiting (blood sport) =

Blood sport

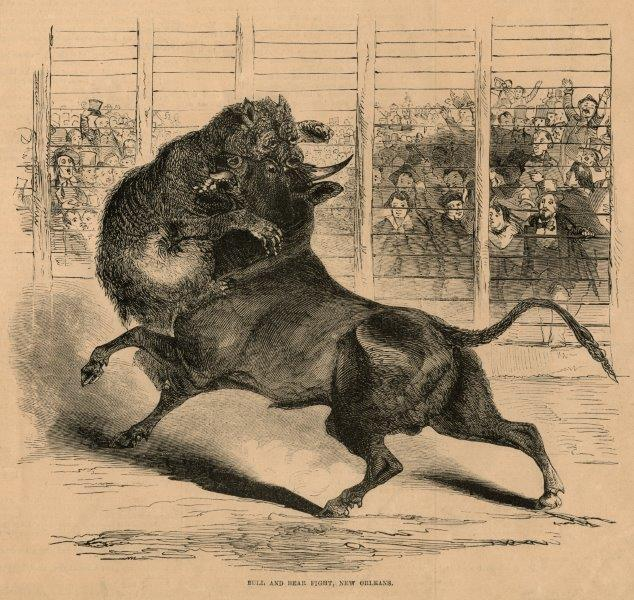
An organized fight between a bear and bull, 1853.

Baiting is a blood sport in which animals are provoked or attacked by another animal for the purpose of entertainment or gambling. This activity is illegal in most countries with varying levels of enforcement.

== History ==
During various periods of history and in different cultures around the world, various types of baiting, named for the species used, have been confirmed. These include badger-baiting, bear-baiting, bull-baiting, donkey-baiting, duck-baiting, hog-baiting, human-baiting, hyena-baiting, lion-baiting, monkey-baiting, rat-baiting, and wolf-baiting. Much of what is known about baiting comes from England in the Middle Ages, although it has not been legal there for some time. It is still practiced, however, in other parts of the world, including some cultures of Central Asia.

== Restrictions ==
=== Political ===
- South Sudan: The Criminal Code states that anyone arranging, promoting or organizing fights between cocks, rams, bulls or other domestic animals, or encouraging such acts, shall be sentenced to imprisonment for a term not exceeding two months or to a fine, upon conviction.

== See also ==
- Cruelty to animals
