= Rubber banding =

Rubber banding or rubberbanding may refer to:

- Banding (medical), using an elastic band to constrict an area in medicine
  - rubber band ligation, a treatment for internal hemorrhoids that cuts off blood flow to the hemorrhoid, causing it to shrink and fall off in days
  - elastration, using banding to remove the tail or scrotum of an animal
- in online video gaming, rubber banding is the undesirable visual effect of latency, known as lag, in which a moving object appears to leap from one place to another without passing through the intervening space; also called "warping" or "teleporting". More specifically, as a character runs forward it will reappear to where it was previously, as if a rubber band was attached and snapped the character back. This occurs when there is a desync between the system the game is being played on and the online server, where the server keeps resetting the character to a previous point.
- in video games, generally speaking, the rubberband effect in dynamic game difficulty balancing is where AI characters falling behind may get a boost by the game while those ahead may be hindered.
- in 2D computer graphics, anchoring a line segment at one end and moving the other end
- in console gaming, this can refer to the act of holding a trigger down with a rubber band in order to perform some kind of auto-attack or cheat.
- in online conferencing it can refer to distortion of the voice that speeds up, slows down or cuts out
