= Crutching =

Sheep husbandry practice

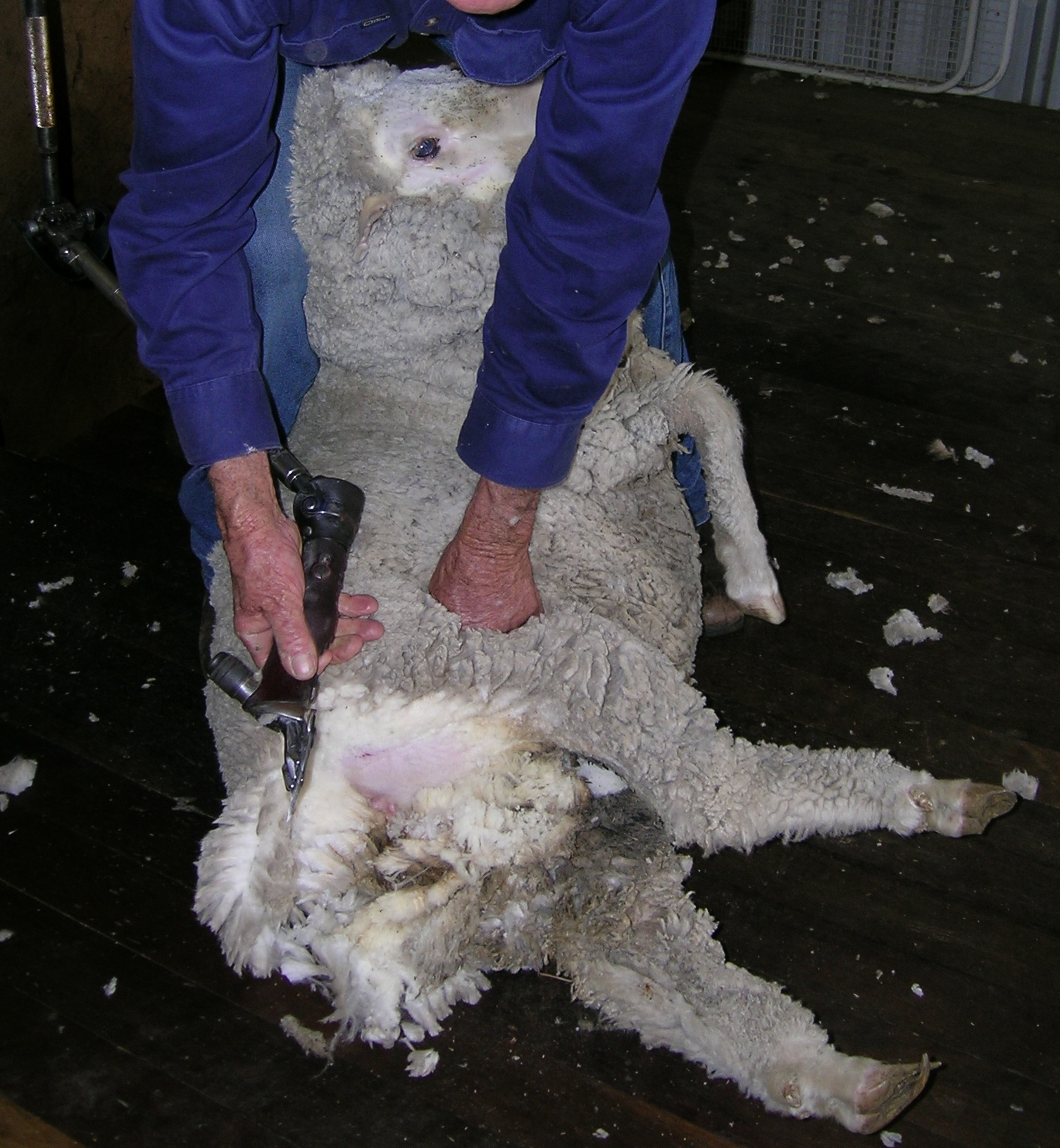
Crutching a sheep that has been wigged (eye-wooled).

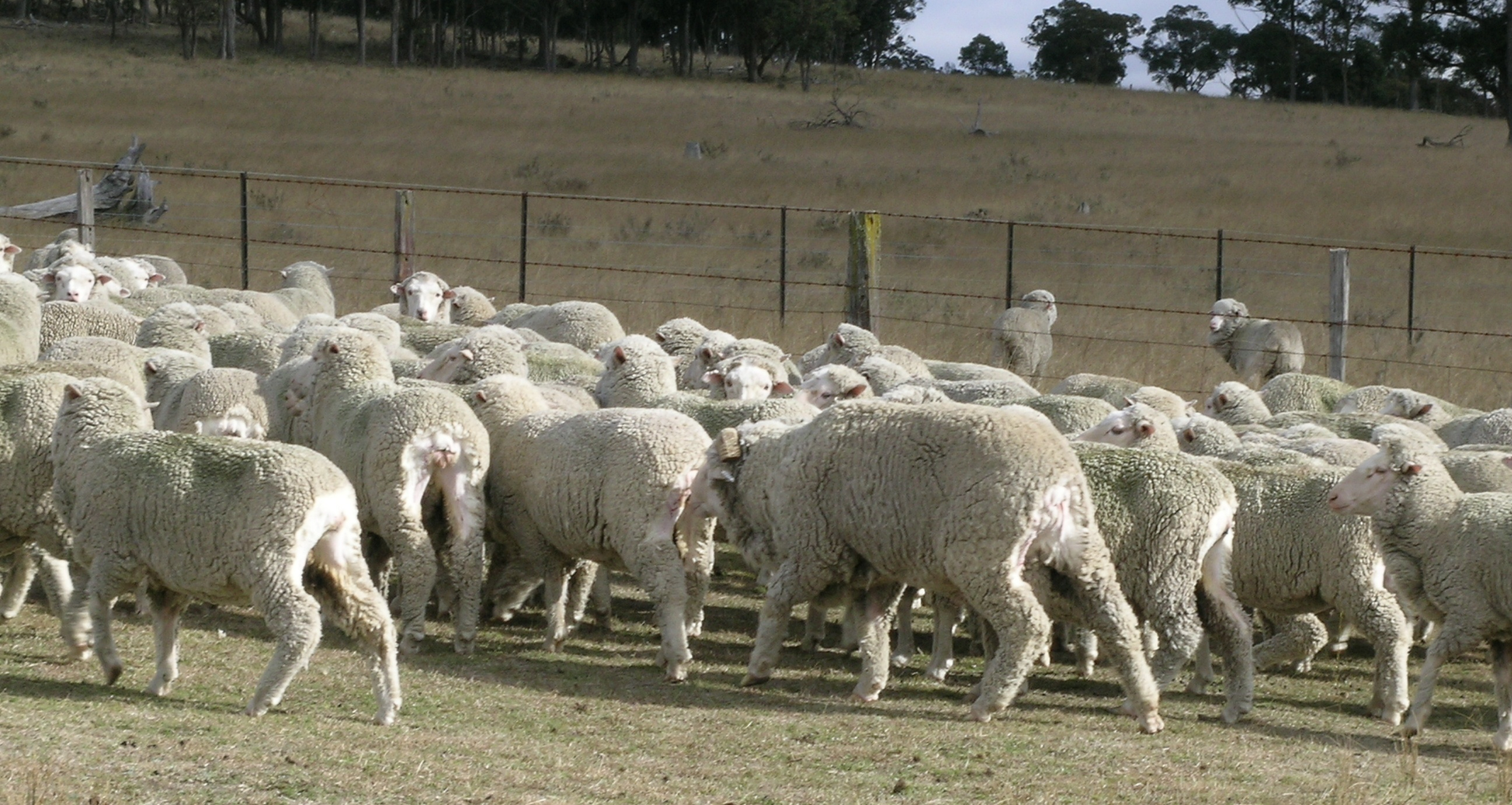
Freshly crutched and wigged Merino sheep.

Crutching refers to the removal of wool from around the tail and between the rear legs of a sheep for hygiene purposes. It can also refer to removing wool from the heads of sheep (wigging or eye-wooling). It does not refer to the process of mulesing—a controversial procedure that involves removing strips of wool-bearing skin from around the breech (buttocks) of a sheep.

== Motivation ==
Through centuries of selective breeding, most recently through artificial insemination, domestic sheep have denser and longer wool than their wild forebears, which may require human intervention to maintain. Sheep with heavy fleeces of wool often develop stains or dags on their rear ends from faeces. In ewes, urine can also stain the wool. To avoid discomfort to the sheep and damage to the fleece, graziers remove the wool (and any dags) from the sheep.

Urine and watery faeces from eating spring grass can also lead to myiasis (fly-strike), which occurs when flies lay eggs in warm, damp wool and the fly larvae grow and eat into the sheep. Crutching is an effective way to help prevent this; in some areas, crutching is carried out at the start of the fly season (which depends on local climatic conditions) and may be needed at intervals of 6–8 weeks in high fly risk conditions.

Rams and wethers may also be rung (crutched) on the belly around the pizzle (genitals) to prevent fly-strike there.

Wigging (removal of wool from the head of sheep) is carried out to prevent the sheep from becoming "wool blind", in which the wool covers the sheep's eyes. It also prevents accumulation of grass seeds and burrs in wool around the head as a sheep grazes. Both these problems are more severe in breeds with heavy wool growth such as Merinos.

In addition, ewes are generally crutched prior to lambing if they are not "offshears" (recently shorn), in order to provide the newborn lamb with a cleaner suckling area.

== Procedure ==
Crutching is generally carried out in shearing sheds, using shearers and the same tools as for shearing the entire fleece, as crutching is simply shearing only a portion of the animal. Blade shears may be used, especially where an individual sheep is particularly dirty, or flystruck. Generally, whole flocks are treated together. A mechanical shearing handpiece is used, and the graziers sit the sheep between their legs and shear the required portion of the sheep, leaving the main fleece to continue growing. There are also many varieties of crutching cradles which allow the sheep to be crutched with less physical strain to the operator.

For small flocks, a grazier might do the work single-handedly. For large flocks and stud sheep, graziers will hire shearers, or use a contractor who provides professional shearing teams to do the required work. The grazier would decide on the extent of crutching: the rear of the sheep is almost always shorn, whereas wool around the face, ears, underside and pizzle may also be removed depending on the circumstances such as the weather, length of fleece, and amount of seed or other impurities present in the fleece and the underlying reason for crutching (preventive of fly-strike, or to reduce the likelihood of stain in the fleece wool). Super fine wool Merino flocks are often given a light crutch, known as a New England crutch that removes less of the valuable fleece.

When a single or small number of sheep need crutching, graziers will often work in the paddock using dagging (or blade) shears or portable powered shearing gear instead of driving the sheep into the shearing shed and back.

== Related procedures ==
Docking (shortening or outright removing) sheep's tails has much the same benefits for the sheep as crutching. While this procedure may reduce the care needed to keep wool clean, regular crutching may still required for the reasons outlined above.

Mulesing is a process where parts of the skin around the buttocks are outright removed and scarred. Mulesed sheep require much less crutching, as the scar tissue reduces the amount of wool grown on the region. It is the excess wool which gets most soiled from urination and faeces, and which can be perceived to be particularly dirty due to green feeding, rapid changes in feed, or from problems such as internal parasites.

== See also ==
- Sheep shearer
- Sheep shearing
