= Cosmetic mutilation =

Cosmetic mutilation may refer to:

- Female genital mutilation, the cutting or removal of the vulva for non-medical reasons
- Discretionary invasive procedures on animals, such as ear cropping or declawing
- Cosmetic surgery, surgery performed for cosmetic rather than medical reasons
