= Devocalization =

Surgical procedure for pets

Devocalization (also known as ventriculocordectomy or vocal cordectomy; when performed on a dog debarking or bark softening; when performed on a cat demeowing or meow softening) is a surgical procedure where tissue is removed from the vocal cords.

== Indications and contraindications ==
Devocalization is usually performed at the request of an animal owner (where the procedure is legally permitted). The procedure may be forcefully requested as a result of a court order. Owners or breeders generally request the procedure because of excessive animal vocalizations, complaining neighbors, or as an alternative to euthanasia due to a court order.

Risks of the procedure include negative reaction to anesthesia, infection, bleeding, and pain. There is also the possibility that the removed tissue will grow back, or of scar tissue blocking the throat – both cases requiring further surgeries – though with the incisional technique the risk of fibrosis is virtually eliminated.

== Effectiveness ==
The devocalization procedure does not take away a dog's ability to bark. Dogs will normally bark just as much as before the procedure. After the procedure, the sound will be softer, typically about half as loud as before, or less, and it is not as sharp or piercing.

Most devocalized dogs have a subdued "husky" bark, audible up to 20 metres.

== Procedure ==
The surgery may be performed via the animal's mouth, with a portion of the vocal folds removed using a biopsy punch, cautery tool, scissor, or laser. The procedure may also be performed via an incision in the throat and through the larynx, which is a more invasive technique. All devocalization procedures require general anesthesia.

== Reasons for excessive vocalization ==
Chronic, excessive vocalization may be due to improper socialization or training, stress, boredom, fear, or frustration. Up to 35% of dog owners report problems with barking, which can cause disputes and legal problems. The behavior is more common among some breeds of dog, such as the Shetland Sheepdog, which are known as loud barkers, due to the nature of the environment in which the breed was developed.

== Controversy and legislation ==
=== Reasons opposing ===
In some regions of the US and in the UK, convenience devocalization is considered a form of surgical mutilation. Most veterinarians and the RSPCA offer information to behavioral schools on how to train dogs not to bark.

=== Reasons favoring ===
Several reasons are offered in favor of devocalization.

- The animal is no longer subject to constant disapproval (discipline).
- Animals that previously had to be kept indoors can be allowed outdoors again.

Further, breeds and individual animals known for excessive barking/vocalizing have a higher chance of being adopted/rescued and not being repeatedly re-homed if/when training fails.

=== Context ===
Kathy Gaughan points out that "the surgery stops the barking, but it doesn't address why the dog was barking in the first place." Gaughan notes that visitors to her clinic who request debarking are usually looking for a "quick fix". Gaughan states that, commonly, those who seek debarking live in apartments, or have neighbors who complain. Gaughan also counts "breeders with many dogs" among those who most often seek convenience devocalization. However, Gaughan does not agree with those who claim the procedure is cruel, stating: "Recently, some animal advocates have asserted this surgery is cruel to the animal; some countries have even outlawed the procedure. I do not believe the surgical procedure is cruel; however, failing to address the underlying factors is inappropriate."

Some breeders seek the surgery in order to limit or diminish noise levels for personal reasons ranging from convenience to prevention; some breeders even seek the surgery for puppies prior to going to new homes.

=== Opinions of animal welfare societies ===
Multiple animal medicine and animal welfare organizations discourage the use of convenience devocalization, recommending that it be used only as a last resort. However, organizations such as the American Veterinary Medical Association, American Animal Hospital Association and the American Society for the Prevention of Cruelty to Animals, oppose laws that would make devocalization illegal.

The American Veterinary Medical Association's official position is that "canine devocalization should be performed only by qualified, licensed veterinarians as a final alternative after behavioral modification efforts to correct excessive vocalization have failed."

The AVMA's position was later adopted by the American Animal Hospital Association.

The Canadian Veterinary Medical Association's position statement on devocalization of dogs states: "The Canadian Veterinary Medical Association (CVMA) discourages 'devocalization' of dogs unless it is the only alternative to euthanasia, and humane treatment and management methods have failed."

The American Society for the Prevention of Cruelty to Animals (ASPCA) recommends that animal caretakers first attempt to address animal behavior problems with humane behavior modification techniques or with a treatment protocol set up by an animal behavior specialist. The ASPCA recommends surgery only if behavior modification techniques have failed, and the animal is at risk of losing its home or its life.

=== Legal restriction and banning ===
The legality of convenience devocalization varies by jurisdiction.

The procedure is outlawed as a form of mutilation in the United Kingdom and all countries that have signed the European Convention for the Protection of Pet Animals.

==== United Kingdom ====
Debarking is specifically prohibited in the UK, along with ear cropping, tail docking, and declawing (cats too). By law, convenience devocalization is considered a form of surgical mutilation.

==== United States ====
In the United States, laws vary by state. As of 2023, devocalization is illegal in Maryland, Massachusetts, and New Jersey (unless medically necessary). Pennsylvania prohibits the devocalization of dogs for any reason unless the procedure is performed by a licensed veterinarian under anesthesia. California and Rhode Island have enacted legislation that makes it unlawful to require devocalization as a condition of real estate occupancy for tenants who own dogs.

In 2000, anti-debarking legislation was proposed in California, New Jersey, and Ohio. The California and New Jersey bills failed, partially due to opposition from groups who predicted the ban would lead to similar bans on ear cropping and other controversial cosmetic surgical procedures on dogs. The Ohio bill survived, and was signed into law by Governor Robert Taft in August 2000. However, Ohio Revised Code 955.22 outlawed debarking only of dogs considered "vicious".

In February 2009, 15-year-old Jordan Star of Needham, Massachusetts, filed a bill to outlaw performing convenience devocalization procedures upon cats and dogs. The bill was co-sponsored by Senator Scott Brown, with the title Logan's Law, after a debarked sheepdog. Star said of convenience devocalization: "To take a voice away from an animal is morally wrong." The bill became state law on April 23, 2010.

Devocalizing cats and dogs also became illegal in Warwick, Rhode Island, by city ordinance in 2011. A bill to ban devocalization of dogs and cats in New York State passed a vote in the Senate and is currently being considered by an Assembly committee.

== See also ==
- Barking
- Overview of discretionary invasive procedures on animals
