= Overview of discretionary invasive procedures on animals =

Non-therapeutic medical procedures in animals

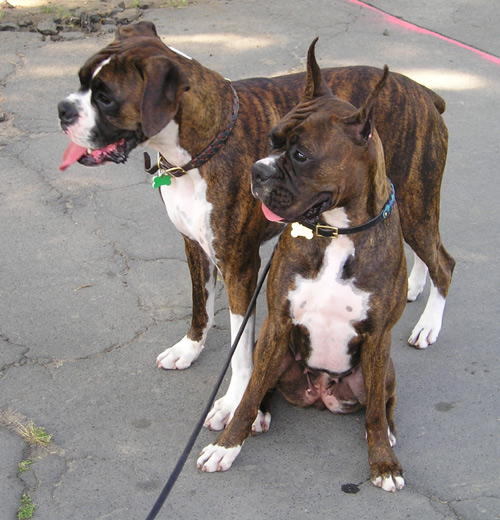
Boxers with natural and cropped ears and docked tails

Numerous procedures performed on domestic animals are usually more invasive than purely cosmetic alterations, but differ from types of veterinary surgery that are performed exclusively for health reasons. Such procedures have been grouped together under the technical term 'mutilatory' by the Royal College of Veterinary Surgeons in a report describing the reasons for their being conducted and their welfare consequences, and by others.

The term mutilatory generally connotes some form of disfigurement or even maiming. There are multiple definitions and interpretations that carry varying degrees of emotional intensity. Merriam-Webster defines "mutilate" as "to cut up or alter radically so as to make imperfect", but gives a relatively mild example: "the child mutilated the book with his scissors". Animal rights advocates often pejoratively refer to these procedures as mutilations. PETA states that one issue with current forms of non-human animal treatment is that the animals "are mutilated and confined to tiny cages so that we can kill them and eat them."

The Royal College of Veterinary Surgeons noted that the term mutilation is often an emotive one, having implications in common usage of maiming and disfigurement. They stated that there was no satisfactory alternative term that would suffice for their purposes. Their definition is a narrower one: "covering all procedures, carried out with or without instruments which involve interference with the sensitive tissues or the bone structure of an animal, and are carried out for non-therapeutic reasons."

== List ==
The following table contains procedures performed on domesticated animals that may or may not have a purported therapeutic purpose.

Invasive procedures on animals
Species	Procedures
Cats	Castration; Claw removal; Devocalization; Tail docking; Tattooing; Tendonectomy
Cattle	Castration; Branding; Dehorning; Ear tagging; Nose ringing; Restraint; Tail docking; Tongue resection (calves)
Dogs	Castration; Devocalization/Debarking; Dewclaw removal; Ear cropping; Tail docking; Tail nicking (Note: 'Tail nicking' in dogs involves cutting the retractor muscles below the tail to affect the carriage of the tail.); Tattooing; Teeth removal
Ferrets	De-scenting (Note: Removing the anal scent sac to reduce animal odor); Tattooing
Horses	Castration; Branding; Pin firing (Note: 'Pin firing', sometimes called 'firing', is a therapy that uses a small, red-hot probe to cause cauterization (burning) of tissue in horses with chronic injuries to produce an abundant, serous inflammatory process.); Tail blocking (Note: 'Tail blocking' involves injecting the major motor nerves of a horse's tail with alcohol to affect the horse's ability to lift, or even move, its tail.); Tail docking; Tail nicking (Note: 'Tail nicking' in horses involves cutting the retractor muscles below the tail to affect the carriage of the tail. For some breeds, the tail is then placed in a tail set to shape it into an artificial position.)
Laboratory mice	Ear tagging; Earmark (agriculture); Tail clipping (Note: 'Tail clipping' in mice involves the removal of a section of the tail for tissue required in the development of genetically altered strains.); Tattooing; Toe clipping (Note: 'Toe clipping' in mice involves the full or partial amputation of one or more digits as a means of permanent identification.)
Pigs	Castration; Ear docking; Ear tagging; Earmarking; Nose ringing; Tail docking; Tattooing; Teeth clipping; Tusk trimming
Poultry	Beak-trimming; Decrowing; Blinders (Note: 'Blinders' or 'spectacles' are included as some versions require a pin to pierce the nasal septum.); Caponizing; Desnooding (Note: 'Desnooding' is the removal of the snood, a fleshy appendage on the forehead of turkeys.); Detoeing; Devoicing; Dewinging; Dubbing (Note: 'Dubbing' is the procedure of removing the comb, wattles and sometimes earlobes of poultry. Removing the wattles is sometimes called "dewattling".); Foie gras force feeding; Feather plucking; Pinioning (Note: Pinioning is the act of surgically removing one pinion joint, the joint of a bird's wing farthest from the body, to prevent flight.); Spur removal; Toe clipping
Sheep	Castration; Ear tagging; Earmarking; Dehorning; Marking (Note: 'Marking' is the simultaneous mulesing, castration and tail docking of lambs.); Mulesing (Note: 'Mulesing' is the removal of strips of wool-bearing skin from around the breech (buttocks) of a sheep to prevent flystrike (myiasis)); Tail docking; Teeth grinding
Skunks	De-scenting
Snakes	Venom duct removal
Prawns/shrimp	Eyestalk ablation (Note: 'Eye ablation' is the removal of one or both eyestalks to improve reproduction in female prawns/shrimp.)
Various (Note: The various list contains procedures that may be performed on many animals including the animals listed, or procedures performed on animals not listed.)	Artificial insemination; Castration/(caponization); Earmarking; Ear tagging; Tattooing

== See also ==
- Animal-borne bomb attacks
- Anti-tank dog
- Bat bomb
- Bile bear
- Cattle mutilation
- Cruelty to animals
- Mutilation
- Painted fish
- Project Pigeon
