= Teeth clipping =

Trimming of newborn piglets' teeth

Teeth clipping in pigs is a management practice in which the sharp tips of newborn piglets' teeth are trimmed or filed to reduce the risk of injury to sows during nursing and minimize aggression-related injuries among piglets.

Some piglets are born with erupted teeth; in order to avoid sow teat injury and damage between piglets, some farms clip their deciduous teeth. Lesions caused by piglet teeth are superficial, and mortality is lower among pigs that don't undergo painful procedures, including teeth clipping.

== Disadvantages ==
Some of the disadvantages of teeth clipping are:

- Piglets may stop eating due to pain
- Antibiotic overuse
- Decreased weight gain
- Hemorrhage (blood loss)
- Teeth fracture
- Gum damage
- Abscess
- Mouth infections
- Joint infections
- Systemic infections
- Lethargy due to infection
- Higher stress and cortisol, which reduces muscle mass in pigs

Many contend that the harms of teeth clipping exceed the benefits.

== Ethics ==
Teeth clipping, if done without anesthetic or analgesic (a common practice), is painful. Teeth clipping often exposes the dental pulp, thereby exposing nerves, causing chronic pain. If the exposed dental pulp becomes infected, extreme pain will follow.

== Alternatives ==
Smaller litter sizes, less dense and intensive pig farming, cage-free farming, and better feed for sows.

== See also ==
- Cruelty to animals
- Overview of discretionary invasive procedures on animals
- Intensive pig farming
