= Banding (medical) =

Medical procedure which uses elastic bands for constriction

Banding is a medical procedure which uses elastic bands for constriction. Banding may be used to tie off blood vessels in order to stop bleeding, as in the treatment of bleeding esophageal varices. The band restricts blood flow to the ligated tissue, so that it eventually dies and sloughs away from the supporting tissue. This same principle underlies banding as treatment for hemorrhoids.

Banding may also be used to restrict the function of an organ without killing it. In gastric banding to treat obesity, the size of the stomach is reduced so that digestion is slowed and the patient feels full more quickly.

Banding (elastration) as a medical procedure is commonly used in livestock for male castration of sheep and cattle. Banding is also commonly done in tail docking of lambs to prevent flystrike, and less commonly, used to dock tails of dairy cattle and draft horses. The bands are applied at the base of the scrotum or desired tail site, restricting blood flow to the scrotum or tail tissue, which eventually dies and sloughs away from the body. The procedure is frequently performed by trained farm personnel using recommendations by a licensed veterinarian and local agricultural extension agents.
