= Mulesing =

Sheep husbandry practice

Mulesing is the removal of strips of wool-bearing skin from around the breech (buttocks) of a sheep to prevent the parasitic infection flystrike (myiasis). The wool around the buttocks can retain faeces and urine, which attracts flies. The scar tissue that grows over the wound does not grow wool, so is less likely to attract the flies that cause flystrike. Mulesing is a common practice in Australia for this purpose, particularly on highly wrinkled Merino sheep. Mulesing is considered by some to be a skilled surgical task. Mulesing can only affect flystrike on the area cut out and has no effect on flystrike on any other part of the animal's body.

Mulesing is a controversial practice. The National Farmers Federation of Australia says that "mulesing remains the most effective practical way to eliminate the risk of 'flystrike' in sheep" and that "without mulesing up to 3,000,000 sheep a year could die a slow and agonising death from flystrike". The Australian Veterinary Association (AVA) "recognises the welfare implications of mulesing of sheep. However, in the absence of more humane alternatives for preventing breech strike, the AVA accepts that the practice of mulesing should continue as a sheep husbandry procedure". The AVA also supports the use of analgesics and the accreditation of mulesing practitioners. The Australian Royal Society for the Prevention of Cruelty to Animals accepts mulesing when the risk of flystrike is very high, when it is done properly, and even then only as a last resort. The animal rights organisation PETA strongly opposes mulesing, says the practice is cruel and painful, and that more humane alternatives exist, and claim that sheep can be spared maggot infestation through more humane methods, including special diets, spray washing, and breeding different kinds of sheep. Sheep after mulesing are noted to have markedly elevated levels of the hormones cortisol and β-endorphin, (Note: Approximately 220% and 300% the amount of cortisol and β-endorphin concentration in plasma, respectively, than in the control.) respectively associated with stress and pain.

In July 2009, representatives of the Australian wool industry scrapped an earlier promise, made in November 2004, to phase out the practice of mulesing in Australia by 31 December 2010. The New Zealand industry began phasing out mulesing in 2007, and a ban of mulesing sheep officially came into effect from 1 October 2018.

== Background ==
The Australian sheep blowfly (in fact an invasive species from South Africa) afflicts many sheep in Australia. In the late 19th century Merino sheep in Australia were crossbred with loose-skinned Merino sheep from Vermont. This resulted in such a productive fleece that it formed wrinkles on the animal. The popularity of Merino wool in the 20th century led Australian sheep breeders to continue selecting for the thickest possible fleeces on their sheep. This lucrative trait often meant that the thick, wrinkled wool on the sheep's rear readily attracted and held dirt and faeces. This collection of unsanitary material as well as the skin ulcers it sometimes caused are very attractive to gravid female blowflies. Female blowflies seek out sheep with wounds and soiled wool to lay their eggs. Once the maggots hatch they gravitate to open wounds if any are present. This is flystrike, a type of myiasis. Flystrike, also called breechstrike, often leads to systemic secondary infections and death.

In the early 1930s an Australian grazier named John Mules was shearing a ewe when he accidentally cut off a small patch of skin near the ewe's breech (buttocks). The ewe had suffered from flystrike before and Mules carefully watched her progress in case she developed another infestation in the wound he had accidentally caused. To Mules' surprise, once the wound healed it replaced tangled and dirty breech wool with smooth scar tissue. Blowflies were no longer attracted to this area on the ewe as it could not collect dirt or faeces. No relapse of flystrike occurred. Mules and others soon developed this into a technique now known as mulesing.

During this operation small strips of skin are peeled from a sheep's buttock using steel shears on either side of the anus and underside of the tail. This was formerly performed on mature sheep but it was later found that lambs recover more quickly and completely than older animals. For lambs older than two months the period of greatest discomfort seems to last for approximately two weeks, by which time healing is almost complete. As of 2006, CSIRO's (an Australian-based international organisation) codes of practice ban mulesing for sheep over 12 months of age.

Mulesing reduces the likelihood of flystrike by about 13 times. The practice became nearly universal during the 20th century. The success of animal rights movements in agitating for the procedure's curtailment has brought the proportion of Australian sheep graziers who practice mulesing down to around 70%. Successful international boycotts of Australian Merino wool in the early 2000s set those invested in Australian sheep rearing on the hunt for alternatives. The publicity generated intense interest in finding a replacement for mulesing that domestic and international consumers will accept.

== Method ==
Mulesing is a procedure which, in Australia, is carried out by a person who has completed the mandatory accreditation and training programme, usually a professional mulesing contractor.

While the lamb is under restraint (typically in a marking cradle), the wrinkled skin in the animal's breech (rump area) is cut away from the perianal region down to the top of the hindlimbs. Originally, the procedure was typically performed with modified wool-trimming metal shears, but now there are similar metal shears designed specifically for mulesing. In addition, the tail is docked and the remaining stump is sometimes skinned. The cuts are executed to avoid affecting underlying muscle tissue.

The New South Wales Department of Primary Industries states in the Standard Operating Procedures that, "While the operation causes some pain, no pre or post operative pain relief measures are used". Antiseptics, anaesthesia and painkillers are not required by Australian law during or after the procedure but are often applied, as the procedure is known to be painful to the animal. Products have been approved for pain relief during the procedure, including Tri-Solfen. The minor use permit for Tri-Solfen makes the product available for use by both veterinarians and sheep industry employees, such as mulesing contractors and graziers.

After a heavy mules, non-wooled skin around the anus (and vulva in ewes) is pulled tight, the cut heals and results in smooth scar tissue that does not get fouled by faeces or urine. Most sheep have a light mules which does not leave the skin bare, but simply removes the skin wrinkle leaving a reduced area to grow wool and stain.

When managed according to the standards, policies and procedures developed by the CSIRO, lambs are normally mulesed a few weeks after birth. The operation usually takes less than a minute. Standard practice is to do this operation simultaneously with other procedures such as ear marking, tail docking, and vaccination. Because the procedure removes skin, not any underlying flesh or structure, there is little blood loss from the cut other than a minor oozing on the edges of the cut skin.

Mulesed lambs should be released onto clean pasture. The ewes and suckling lambs should receive minimal disturbance until all wounds are completely healed (about four weeks). Observation should be carried out from a distance.

Mulesing should be completed well before the flystrike season, or else chemical protection should be provided to reduce risk to the lambs and ewes.

Lambs that are slaughtered soon after weaning generally do not need mulesing because they can be protected by chemical treatment for the short time they are at risk.

== Comparison to crutching ==
Mulesing is different from crutching. Crutching is the mechanical removal of wool around the tail and anus (and vulva in ewes) in breeds of sheep with woolly points where this is necessary. Mulesing is the removal of skin to provide permanent resistance to breech strike in Merino sheep. Other breeds tend to have less loose skin and wool so close to the tail, and may have less dense wool.

Crutching has to be repeated at regular intervals as the wool grows continuously. Frequent crutching of Merinos reduces the incidence of flystrike, but not as much as mulesing.

== Opposition to mulesing ==
Some animal rights activists consider unanesthetised mulesing to be inhumane and unnecessary. They have also argued that mulesing may mask genetic susceptibility to flystrike allowing for genetic weaknesses to be continued.

In addition, some animal welfare organisations have criticised the term “mulesing”, proposing the term “live lamb cutting” instead to emphasise what they describe as the painful and cruel nature of the procedure.

Proponents of mulesing are largely from Australia where severe and often fatal flystrike is common.

In October 2004, American fashion retailer Abercrombie & Fitch Co. responded to pressure from PETA to boycott Australian Merino wool due in part to the use of mulesing in Australia. The National Farmers' Federation responded by stating "Abercrombie and Fitch does not use Australian wool". Then, in December 2008, one of the world's largest retailers, Liz Claiborne (in which PETA is a shareholder), banned the use of Australian Merino wool in its products in opposition to the mulesing practice; at the time an Australian Wool Innovations spokesman said "the company did not purchase any Australian wool". In June 2009, British department store chain John Lewis joined the wool boycott. The international fashion retailer New Look also refuses to stock products made from Australian Merino wool. The campaign by PETA also seeks to draw attention to Australia's live sheep-export trade. PETA's campaign has hurt the Australian wool industry with several American and European clothing retailers agreeing to the boycott.

Australian interior furnishing wholesaler Instyle Contract Textiles endorses the cessation of mulesing. In early 2008, the company signed an exclusive worldwide agreement with The SRS Company to source wool from non-mulesed Merino sheep that have been bred specifically to be naturally resistant to flystrike.

The controversy reignited after a television programme aired in Sweden. This programme alleged that a lobbying consultant, Kevin Craig, acting on behalf of the Australian Wool and Sheep Industry Taskforce, offered a Swedish activist a free trip to Australia if the activist agreed not to go on camera nor do an interview. As a consequence, 19 clothing manufacturers and retailers in Sweden banned the purchase of wool from sheep that have been mulesed. Shortly thereafter, Swedish Agriculture Minister Eskil Erlandsson was reported saying that he was "satisfied that Australia appeared to be responding to international concerns about mulesing and that bans or boycotts were not necessary", while affirming that he hoped to see the practice of mulesing come to an end.

Some European retailers have agreed to lift their ban on Australian Merino wool if pain relief is used during mulesing. The retailers have not been named in an effort to avoid any backlash.

In order to help comply with the 2010 deadline to phase out mulesing, Western Australia's governmental research stations ceased mulesing their sheep on 1 April 2008.

Australian Wool Innovation (AWI) had pledged to phase out mulesing by 2010, but PETA accused the Australian wool industry of trying to extend this deadline. On 27 July 2009, the Australian wool industry dumped its long-standing pledge to phase out mulesing by the end of 2010, a move that was harshly criticized by animal welfare groups and led to criticism by some farmers. The AWI maintains that pursuing a deadline approach to eliminating mulesing was not based on "sound health and welfare science" and risked a serious deterioration in the welfare of sheep. Alternative methods of mulesing, such as using clips and intradermals, were "not sufficiently developed to support a wholesale cessation of the procedure in 2010", AWI said.

The AWI's approach is "The ultimate long-term aim of the programme is to reduce the reliance on mulesing." and "supports all woolgrowers in their choice of best practice animal health and hygiene in flystrike control", but aims to provide animal welfare improvements such as pain relief and antiseptics.

In December 2020, Four Paws compiled a list of fashion brands who have taken a stance against mulesing.

== Alternatives ==
=== Freeze branding ===
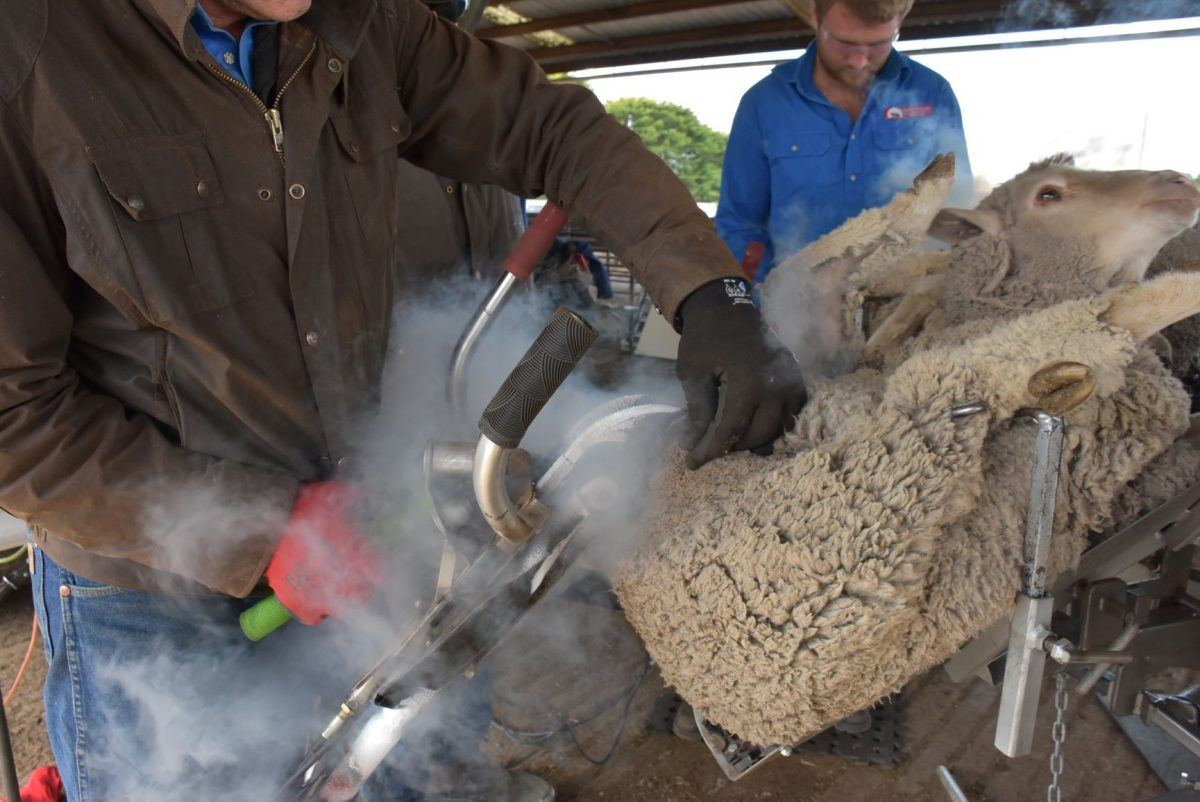
Steining being undertaken in Dubbo, 2022

In response to intense consumer pressure for an alternative to mulesing an adaptation of the freeze branding branding process was hit upon in the 2010s. The new technique was soon christened steining after its developer, John Steinfort, an Australian veterinary scientist. In 2019 Australian Wool Network (AWN), a private corporation servicing the Australian wool industry, provided Steinfort funding to commercialize the technique.

During steining a set of clamping jaws designed by Steinfort is used to pinch up rolls of skin near the tail and anus of a lamb. Once sufficient skin is in the clamps liquid nitrogen is pumped through the jaws and onto the pinched skin. This rapidly freezes the lamb's skin. The goal is to achieve the level of cellular injury that prevents future hair growth but not so much that a 3rd degree cold burn is created. Pinching the skin is thought to mitigate the degree of the cold burn by removing it somewhat from the muscles and connective tissue beneath. The treated skin goes through the same stages of healing seen in the long method of freeze branding, terminating with permanent hairlessness. Studies show this method is at least as good at preventing flystrike as mulesing and carries few long-term consequences for the lamb's later growth and wool production.

Steinfort and others invested in the process have claimed it is less painful and distressing to the animals on which it is practiced. They argue that affected nerve endings are immediately numbed and that sensation does not return during healing, when a scab forms and is eventually sloughed in 6 to 8 weeks. A 2018 study found behavioral markers indicating pain and distress in lambs who had been steined without analgesic treatment compared to those who had been given analgesics. In 2020 a University of Melbourne researcher named Ellen Jongman was commissioned to study the issue by the company Steinfort formed to commercialize his technique, SteinfortAgVet. The name of Steinfort's company subsequently changed to AgVetInnovations. On 22 December 2020 Jongman released preliminary results from her study on the relative pain of mulesing and steining.

Jongman found that mulesing and steining were equally painful on the day of the procedure but that steined lambs appeared to be in less pain than mulesed lambs on subsequent days. Her study tracked and interpreted a series of lamb behaviors like the speed at which it returned to its mother after undergoing either mulesing or steining. She called for further research using physiological data such heart rate and blood sampling in addition to behavioral observations. Jongman's final report was released on 25 January 2021. In March of 2021 AWN cut ties with Steinfort and divested from this application of freeze branding.

=== Breeding programmes ===
As of 22 July 2021 the position of the RSPCA is that Australian Merino sheep have not been ethically bred, as seen in their susceptibility to flystrike. They believe "any painful procedure to change the breech area should only be considered an interim, short-term solution that accompanies a breeding programme that focusses on flystrike resistance, and is carried out only where absolutely necessary to manage at-risk sheep."

Merino sheep bred on selection principles may be more resistant to flystrike because they are plain bodied (lower skin wrinkling around the breech). Studies have shown that flystrike is lower in plain bodied sheep. However, mulesed animals had consistently lower flystrike than unmulesed regardless of body type.

The resistance of plain-bodied Merino sheep to flystrike arose from field investigations by Australian scientists, Drs H. R. Seddon and H. B. Belschner, in the early 1930s. Non-mulesed Merino ewe bodies were graded as plain (A class), wrinkly (B class) and very wrinkly (C class). The plain-bodied (A class) Merino ewes were much less susceptible to flystrike than wrinkly-bodied Merinos (B and C class).

In these Merino flocks, the sheep are plainer than the plain-bodied (A class) Merino ewes and therefore more resistant to flystrike. The rams and semen from these studs are used in over 3,000 of the 45,000 Merino farms in Australia. Using breeding principles, wrinkle-skinned Merino flocks which require mulesing have been transformed into plain-bodied and mules-free flocks within five years.

=== Non-surgical alternatives ===
Several non-surgical alternatives are currently being researched:

- Insecticides: Any number of insecticides are now available for prevention of fly strike, and even early reviews proclaimed the effectiveness of using dip across the whole animal, rather than cutting one small portion that left the rest of the animal still susceptible "dipping is still the most cost-effective means of protecting sheep from flystrike".
- Topical protein-based treatments which kill wool follicles and tighten skin in the breech area (intradermal injections)
- Biological control of blowflies.
- Plastic clips on the sheep's skin folds which act like castration bands, removing the skin (breech clips).
- Tea tree oil as a 1% formulation dip where tests have shown a 100% kill rate of first-stage maggots and a strong repellent effect against adult flies, which prevented eggs being laid on the wool for up to six weeks.

== See also ==
- Agriculture in Australia
- Docking
- Overview of discretionary invasive procedures on animals
