= Animal tattoo =

Tattoo drawn on an animal

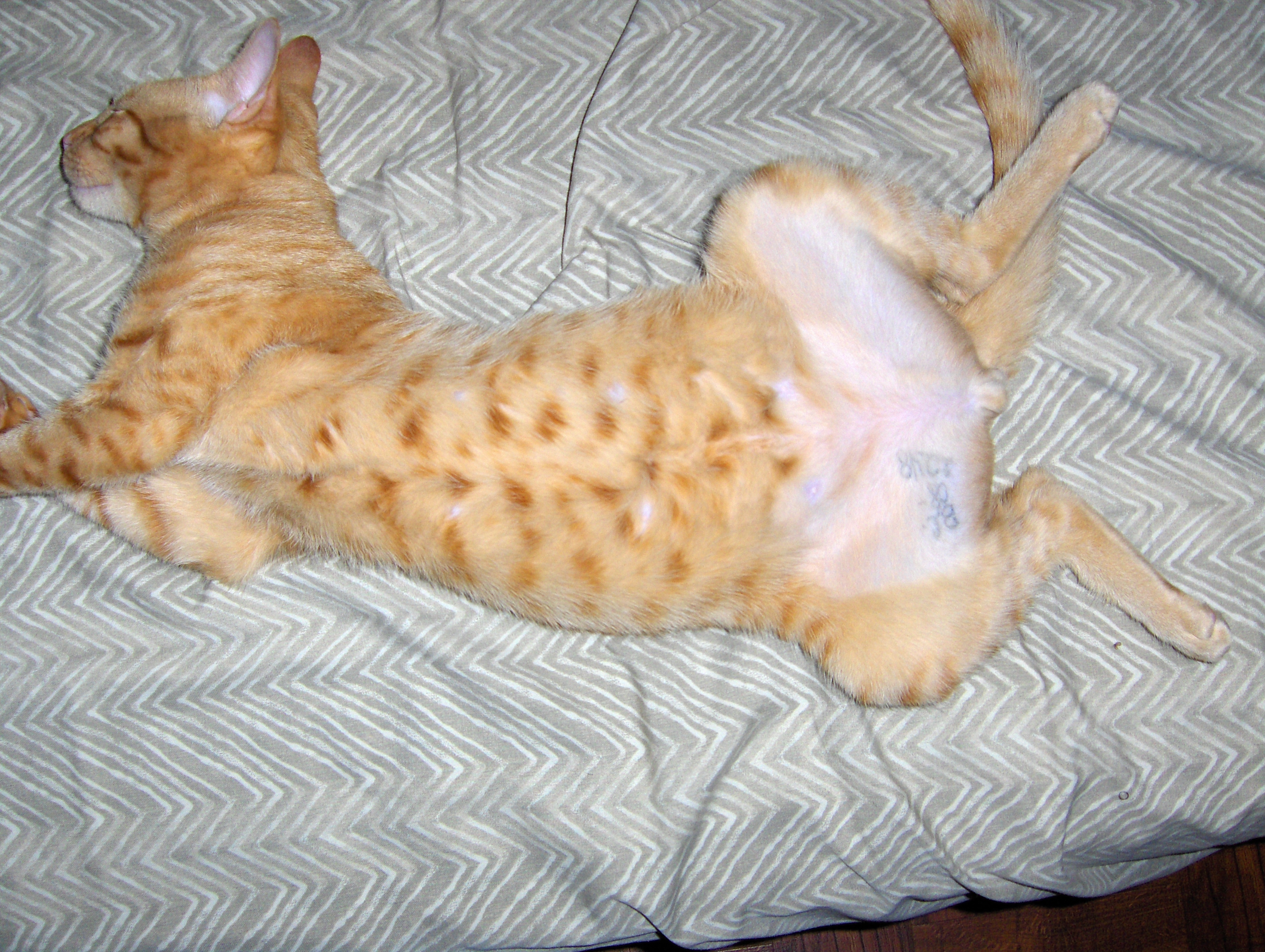
Cat with identification tattoo from Broward County Animal Shelter

An animal tattoo or pet tattoo is a tattoo that a person has placed on an animal, which may be for animal identification, aesthetics, or artistic purposes. Animal identification via tattoo is a practice within the agricultural industry, at breeding farms, in scientific laboratories, and in the identification of domesticated pets. Anaesthetic or other methods of sedation are commonly administered for this type of procedure, with the aim to provide minimal harm and pain to the animal. Pets may also be tattooed with a small mark to permanently indicate that they have been neutered. Tattooing animals for aesthetic or artistic purposes is controversial due to concerns about animal welfare.

== History ==
Animal marking can be traced back to 2,000 B.C., where Egyptians branded their cattle to indicate ownership and prevent theft. When Spanish explorers brought cattle to North America, they also brought the practice of branding. In the late 1800s, the U.S. Army introduced the practice of tattooing horses on their inside upper lip for identification.

== Animal identification ==
The most common use of animal tattooing is for animal identification purposes.

=== Agriculture ===
Animal identification is essential in the agricultural industry, due to its aid in identity confirmation, breeding security and theft prevention. Within the realm of livestock production, animal identification aids producers in the documentation of areas such as reproduction, health issues, milk production and medical procedures.

The method of tattooing identification codes on animals is very complex and specific and is commonly taught very early in agricultural training. There are several different procedures associated with animal identification tattooing; the appropriate procedure is determined through examining the size of the animal, the size of the herd or the various purposes for identification.

Animal identification can either be permanent or non-permanent. Examples of non-permanent animal identification are paint and chalk, whereas tattooing and ear tags are examples of permanent identification. For dairy cattle, beef cattle and goats, tattoos are usually done on the ears. Cats and dogs are usually tattooed either on the ear or stomach, whereas horses are commonly tattooed inside of their lips. The cattle tattooing procedure requires numbers or letters made of sharp needles, rubbing alcohol, tattoo ink, gloves and pliers.

To ensure hygiene and decrease the risk of spreading infection throughout a herd, all tattoo equipment used must be sanitised after use. Several weeks after the tattoo is executed, the ink will dry and flake, leaving a legible permanent identification.

=== Pets ===
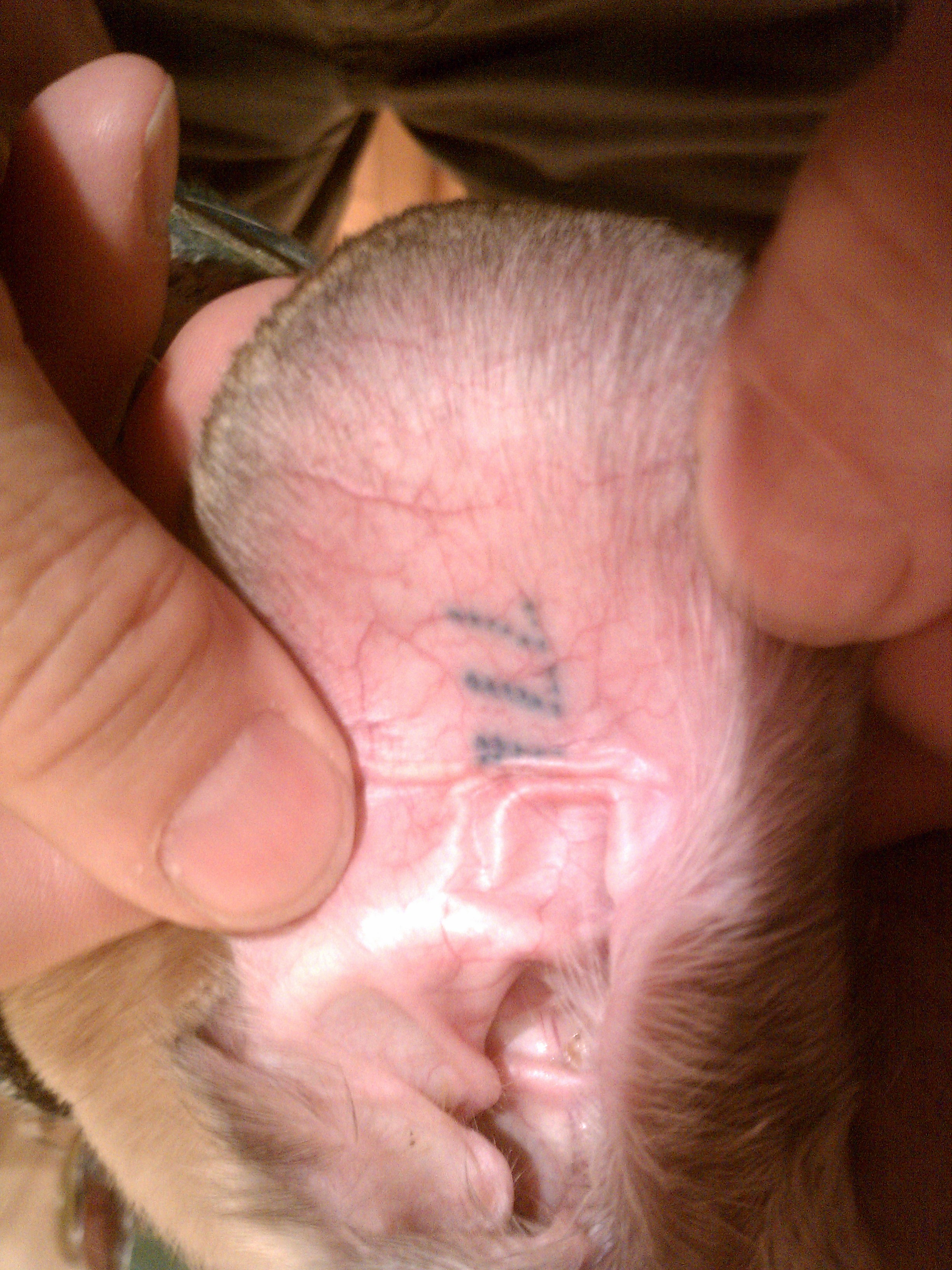
Identification tattoo inside a greyhound's ear

For domesticated pets, tattooing is not recommended as the primary identification procedure. This is because tattooing animals requires heavy sedation as well as specific disinfected equipment for every procedure. Tattoos on domesticated pets are likely to become superfluous due to hair growth and fading over time. There are also no specific guidelines for the placement of identification tattoos on domesticated animals, so it may be hard to detect the whereabouts or existence of an identification tattoo on these animals. For dogs and cats, the primary recommended form of identification is a collar as it is non-intrusive and has a high success rate of reunification with owners when lost. However, identification tattoos can also be beneficial as they are argued to be more reliable and permanent than a collar or microchip. Identification tattoos are also commonly used by breeders to maintain accurate documentation of their kennel.

Some veterinarians and animal rescue organisations apply a small tattoo to signify that a rescued animal has been spayed or neutered. In the United States, the Association of Shelter Veterinarians Veterinary Medical Care Guidelines for Spay-Neuter Programs recommends "the use of a simple green linear tattoo to identify all neutered pet animals". The small green tattoo, also used in Canada, can prevent unnecessary surgery by ensuring that other veterinarians can easily determine that the animal has already been neutered.

It is common for veterinarians and breeders to use an electric tattoo machine to tattoo animals, but sometimes manual hand tattooing is utilised instead. When using an electric tattoo machine, veterinarians and breeders typically put animals under anaesthesia prior to the procedure in order to inflict minimal pain.

=== Biomedical ===
In the biomedical industry, animal identification is important for experimental subjects in a laboratory, predominantly rats. Tattoos help ensure that no domesticated companion animals are accidentally in a research lab. Scientists have studied ear tagging and tattooing for laboratory mice to evaluate how best to identify them with the least detrimental impact on animal welfare.

=== Wildlife ===
Wildlife researchers sometimes need to be able to identify individual animals over time, so they may tattoo identifying marks on animals such as fish. This method has been applied for wild animals including rodents and other small mammals, lizards and other small reptiles, and medium-sized mammals such as possums. Ultraviolet ink tattoos, which are mostly invisible under normal light, may be used instead of dark ink.

== Art and aesthetics ==
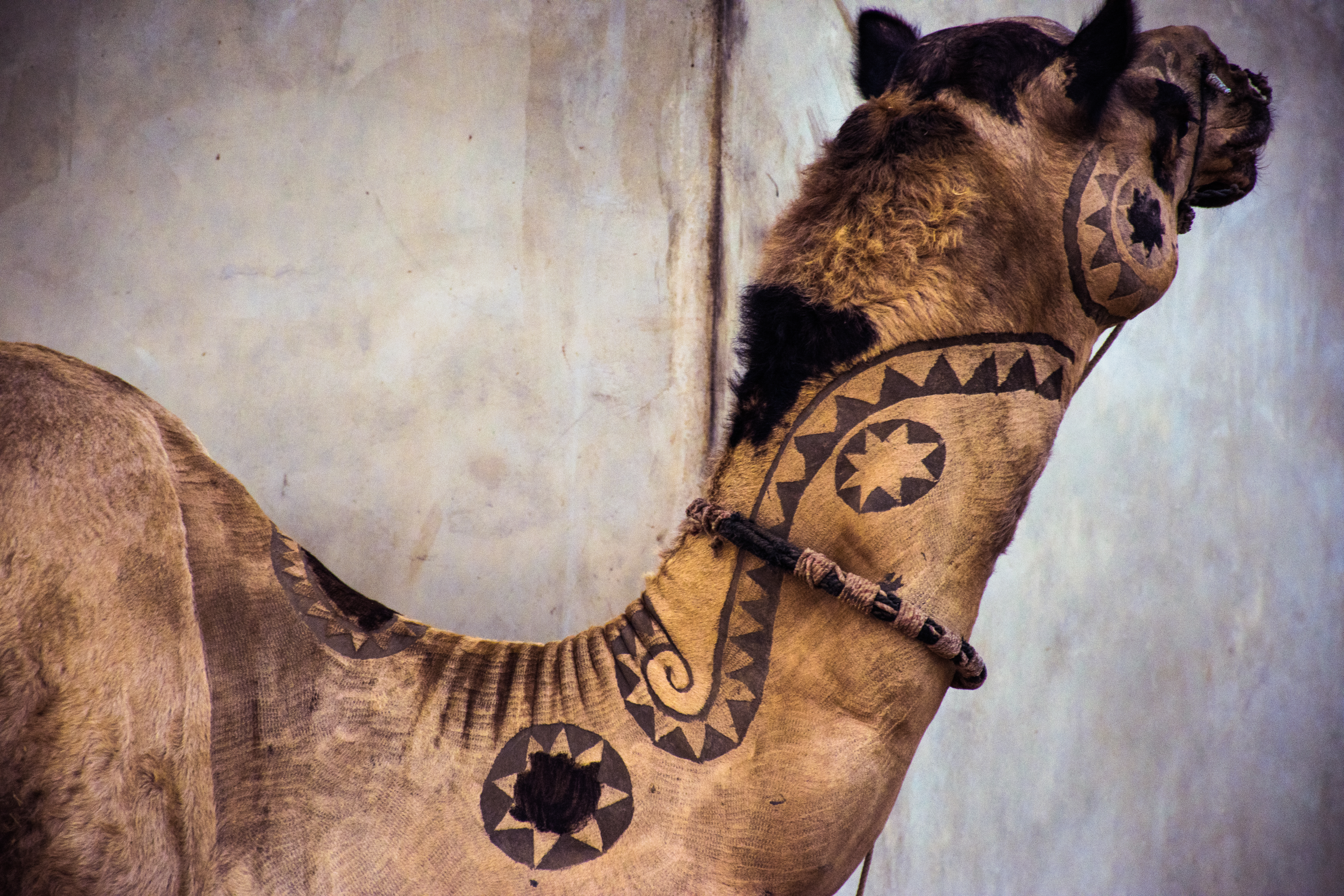
Tattooed camel on the outskirts of the Sariska Tiger Reserve in India

Tattoo artist Bob Shaw stated that in middle of the 20th century, himself, as well as many other tattoo artists, used to tattoo the pink marks on dogs' noses to make them appear completely black for either aesthetic reasons, or to avoid sunburn. Shaw reported that many of his friends that were performing these types of tattoos had black marks on their hands, from the dogs jumping from pain. These tattoo procedures were performed at the veterinary clinic, and dogs were administered a small amount of anaesthetic to avoid great pain.

Wim Delvoye has an artistic and conceptual practice involving the tattooing of live pigs, which he began in 1997. Delvoye is known for tattooing 'pop culture' symbols directly onto live pigs, which he then exhibits them in galleries or on his Art Farm. This has provoked debate about the morality of this art form.

Unnecessary animal tattoos bring up concerns about animal cruelty. An example of tattooing animals for decorative means occurred in Detroit in 2007, where at least seven pet shops in the metro area sold tattooed Parrot Cichlid fish for Valentine's Day. These fish were tattooed with pink lips and the text 'I (heart) U' on their bodies. An injection or a laser was used on the fish in order to imprint a permanent design. This was therefore administered purely for aesthetic means, which provoked disappointment from animal rights activists.
