= Dubbing (poultry) =

Procedure of removing the comb, wattles and sometimes earlobes of poultry

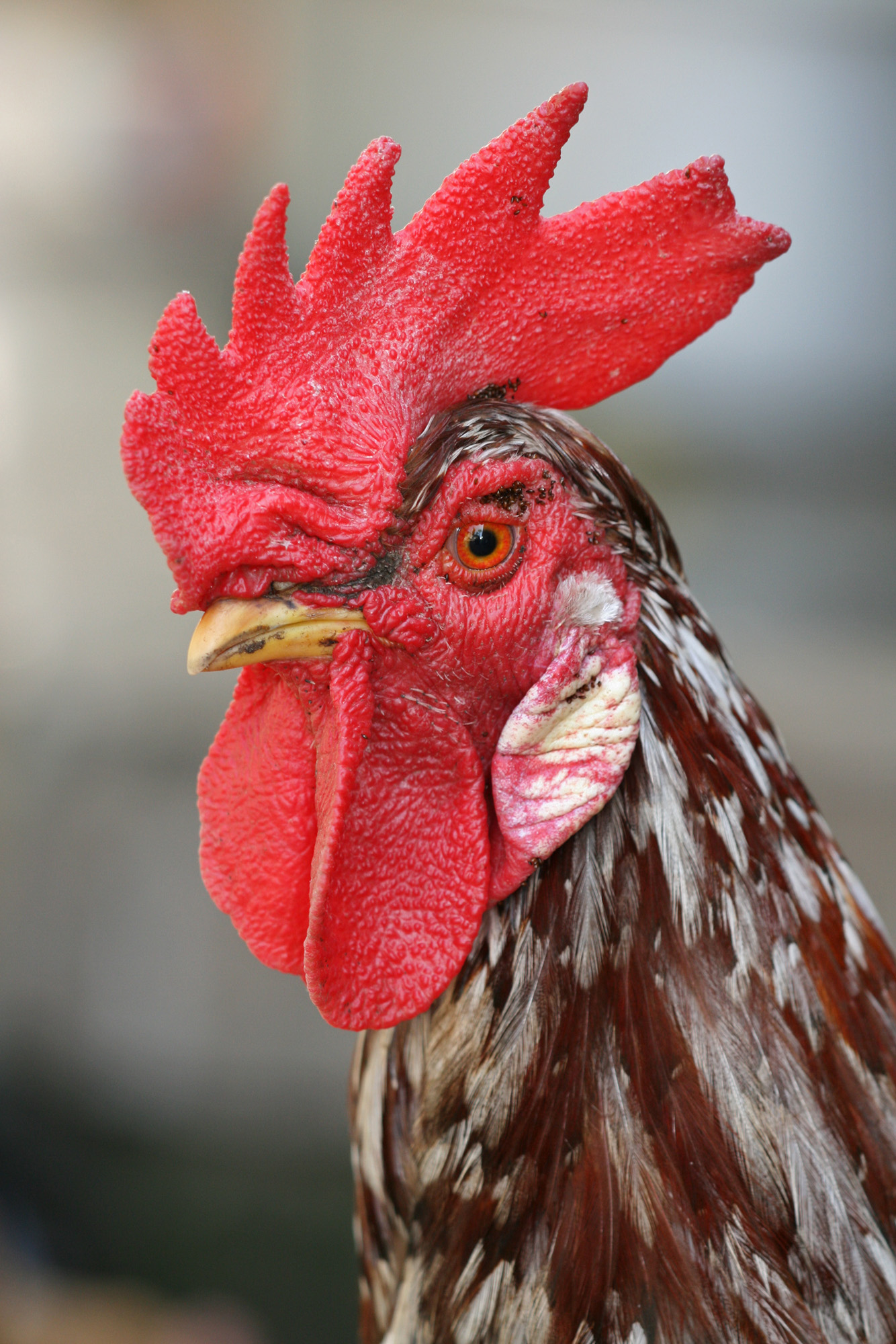
A cockerel that has not been dubbed showing the comb on top of the head, the wattles hanging from the throat and the earlobes (pinky white) hanging from the ears

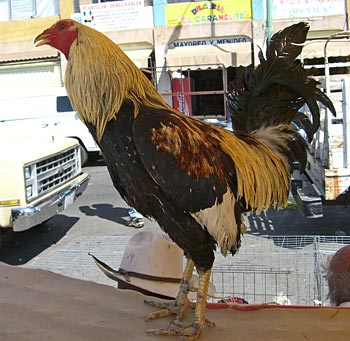
A cockerel that appears to have been dubbed

Dubbing is the procedure of removing the comb, wattles and sometimes earlobes of poultry. Removing the wattles is sometimes called "dewattling".

== Procedure ==
To perform dubbing, the tissues are first disinfected and, if available, an anesthetic is applied to limit pain. Sterile scissors or dubbing shears are used to cut the tissues off, and a styptic, an astringent chemical that reduces bleeding, is applied. The wounds are left uncovered. Some recommend dubbing should be done on day-old chicks whilst others advise waiting until the bird's comb is more developed.

== Benefits ==
Dubbing is sometimes performed to limit damage caused by injury or frostbite. Dubbing for some breeds has become a tradition and is required for some birds to meet breed-specifications. Other reasons include removing combs which have become so large they prevent the bird from taking food into its mouth or making the head so heavy it sinks into the bird's chest.

In the US, the National Chicken Council (2003) listed dubbing of cockerels as one of the acceptable procedures that may cause short-term stress but which are necessary for the long-term welfare of the flock. Dubbing is also performed to prevent injuries from other birds or while being kept in pens.

== Criticism ==
In practice, an anesthetic is rarely used during dubbing and as a consequence, the RSPCA Australia is opposed to dubbing on poultry intended to be exhibited at shows, and describes the practice as a cause of pain and distress. The comb and wattles function in thermoregulation; blood circulating from the comb and the wattles helps the bird lose heat during hot weather. The comb is also used in mate-assessment in some poultry species. Dubbing would interfere with both these functions of the comb and wattles.

In commercial laying hens, those dubbed at hatching exhibit few effects on egg production, but the older the birds are when dubbed, the greater the negative effects of dubbing.

In the UK, the Farm Animal Welfare Council (FAWC) concludes "that removal of the comb offers no welfare advantages to offset the disturbance caused by the procedure and believe the practice should be phased out." The Department for the Environment, Food and Rural Affairs (Defra) writes: "Removal of the comb offers few, if any, welfare advantages in comparison with the disturbance and pain likely to be caused and should be avoided." The Veterinary Surgeons Act 1966 (Schedule 3 Amendment) Order 1988 (SI 1988 No. 526) permits only a veterinary surgeon to remove the combs of a domestic fowl which has reached the age of 72 hours.

In New Zealand, the National Animal Welfare Advisory Committee stated in 2002 they were "working towards a strategy to prevent this practice."

In 2010, the European Food Safety Authority (EFSA) reviewed scientific evidence and concluded "that no mutilation with an effect on welfare as severe as those resulting from cutting off toes or dubbing the comb should be carried out unless justified by evidence for a substantial and unavoidable level of poor welfare in the birds themselves and other birds."

== See also ==
- Debeaking/beak trimming
- Fighting cock
- Overview of discretionary invasive procedures on animals
