= Elastration =

Bloodless method of male castration and docking commonly used for livestock

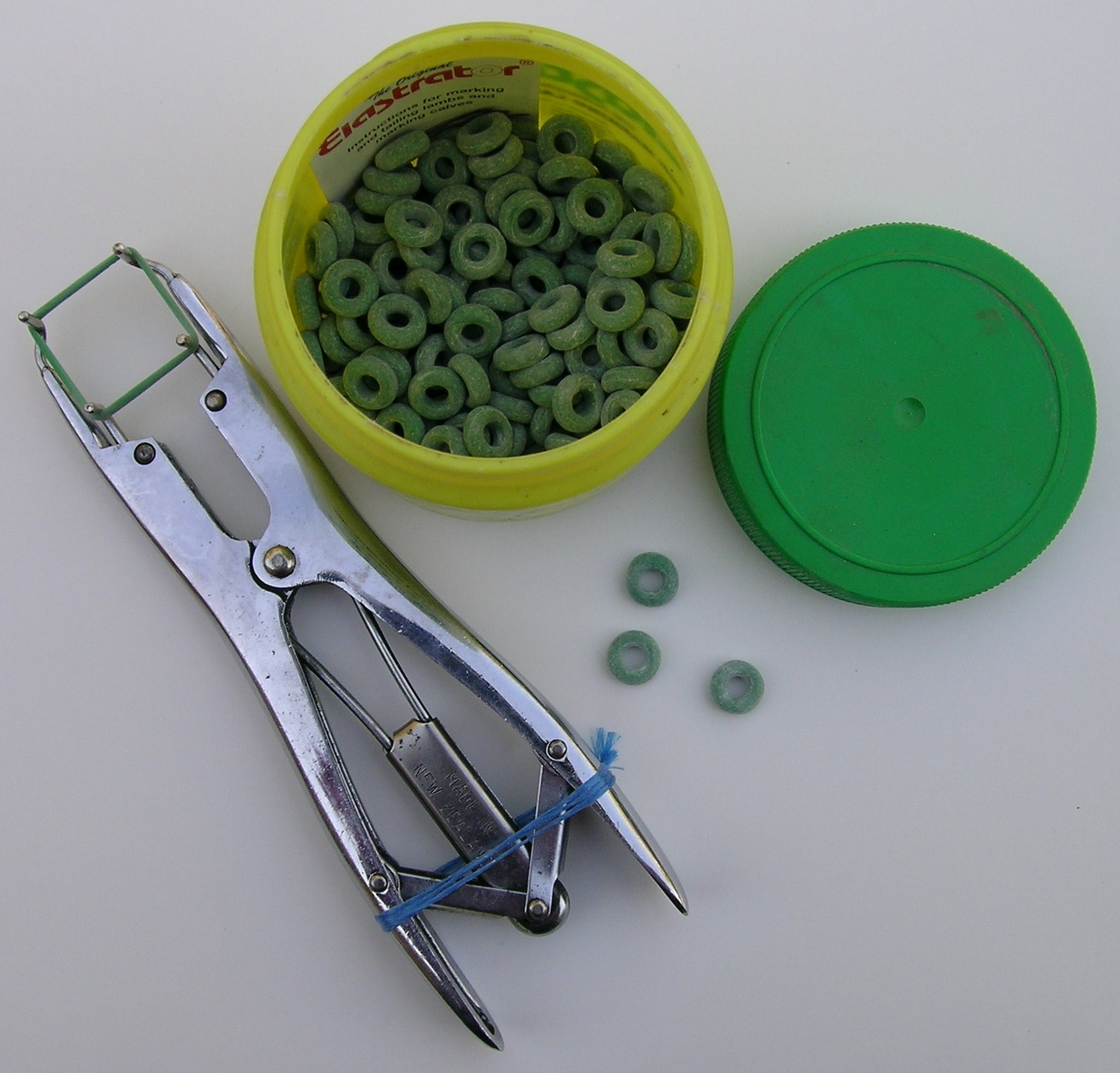
Rubber elastrator rings and pliers

Elastration (a portmanteau of "elastic" and "castration") is a bloodless method of male castration and docking commonly used for livestock. Elastration is simply banding the body part (scrotum or tail) until it drops off. This method is favored for its simplicity, low cost, and minimal training requirements.

== Castration ==
Elastration is the most common method used to castrate sheep and goats, but is also common in cattle.

=== Procedure ===
Elastration involves restraining the animal, without the need for anesthesia or sedation (unlike most other castration methods), in a position that provides access to the genitals. Special elastrator pliers are then used to place a tight latex (rubber) elastrator ring gently around the base of the scrotum. This cuts the blood supply to the scrotum and testicles, which will totally decay and slough off within a few weeks. Care must be taken during the procedure to ensure that both testicles are fully descended and properly located inside the scrotum, and that the animal's nipples are not included within the ring. Elastration is normally limited to castrations done during the first few weeks of life, and it cannot be used for species where the scrotum does not have a narrow base, such as pigs or horses. It is commonly recommended to not use this method on goats until they are 8 weeks or older. This is due to possible complications that could occur later in life like urinary calculi. Goats that are banded during the first month of age are most at risk.

=== Possible complications ===
The country of Lithuania has banned the practice due to their belief that the procedure is inhumane. There is some evidence that elastration is more painful if carried out on older animals, although much of the immediate pain of application can be prevented by injection of local anaesthesia into the scrotal neck and testicles. Practitioners usually try to elastrate as soon as possible, once the testicles have descended, to reduce the amount of dead tissue, infection, and accompanying complications. However, with some animals such as goats, castrating too early increases the frequency of kidney stones and urinary problems due to reduced size of the urethra, so elastration may be postponed. If bull calves are castrated within the first one or two days the testes may sometimes be small and soft enough to be drawn up through the ring, and they continue to develop above the scrotum – surgical castration then becomes necessary.

Improper use of banding can result in death and charges of cruelty.

== Docking ==
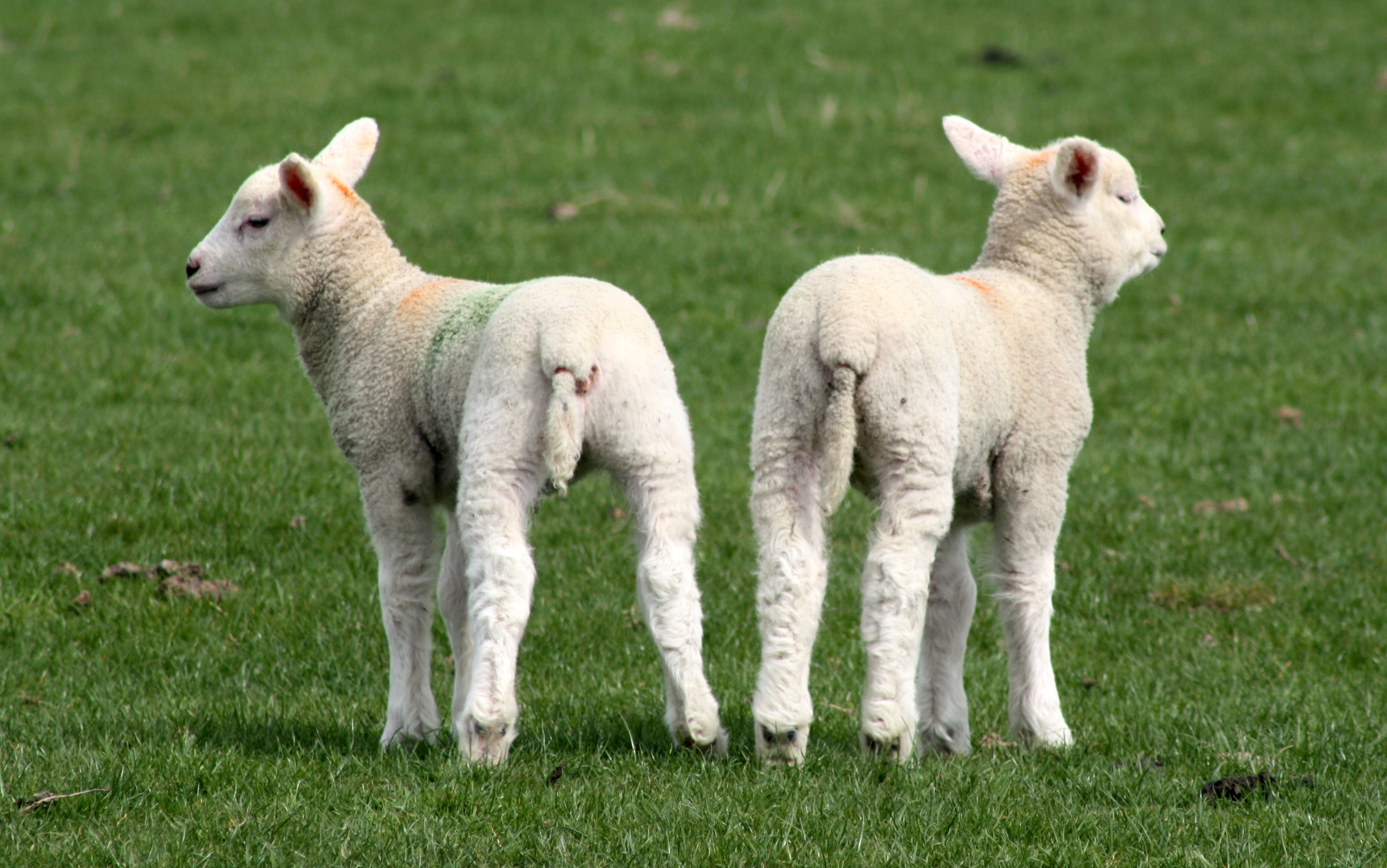
Lambs with rubber rings on their tails

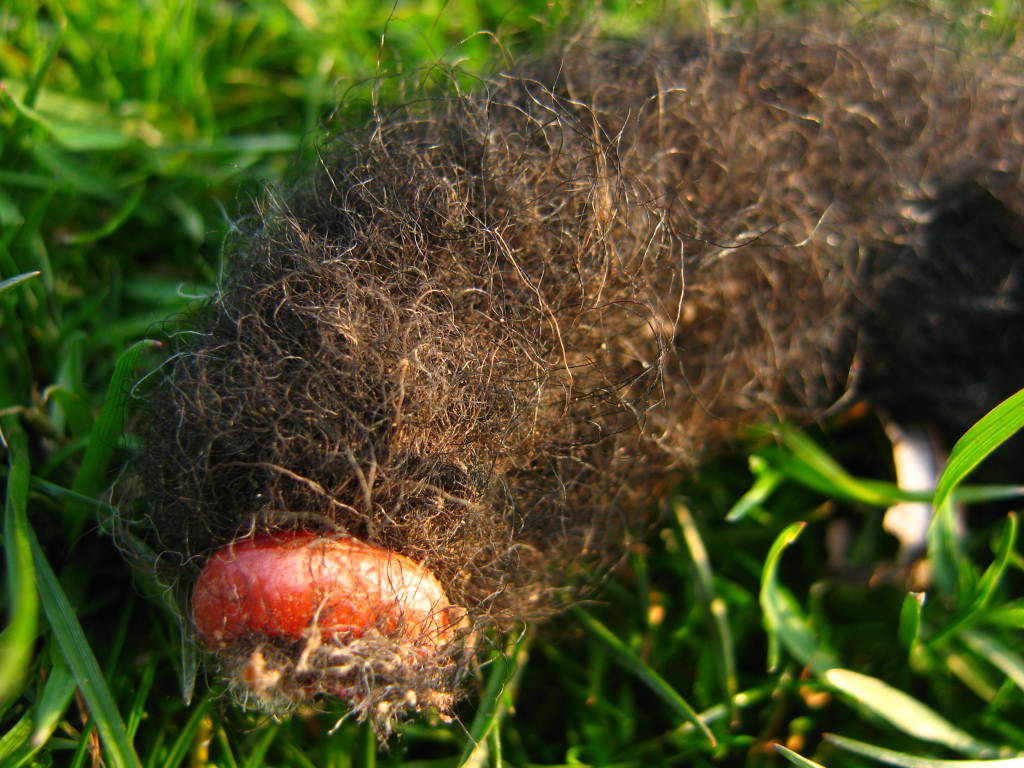
Elastrated lamb tail

The same tool and rings are also used to dock the tails of many breeds of sheep, to prevent dung building up on the tails (which can lead to fly strike). This is usually done at the same time as castration of the ram lambs.

It is also called sheep marking in Australia and signaling in Argentina and Uruguay due to being done at the same time as the "signaling" or marking of the lambs' ears.

== See also ==
- Animal husbandry
- Banding (medical)
- Castration
- Docking (animal)
