= Docking (animal) =

Removal of a portion of the ears or tail

Docking is the intentional removal of part of an animal's tail or, sometimes, ears. The term cropping is more commonly used in reference to the cropping of ears, while docking more commonly—but not exclusively—refers to the tail; the term tailing is used, also. The term has its origins in the living flesh of the tail, commonly known as the dock, from which the animal's tail hairs grow.

== Pigs ==
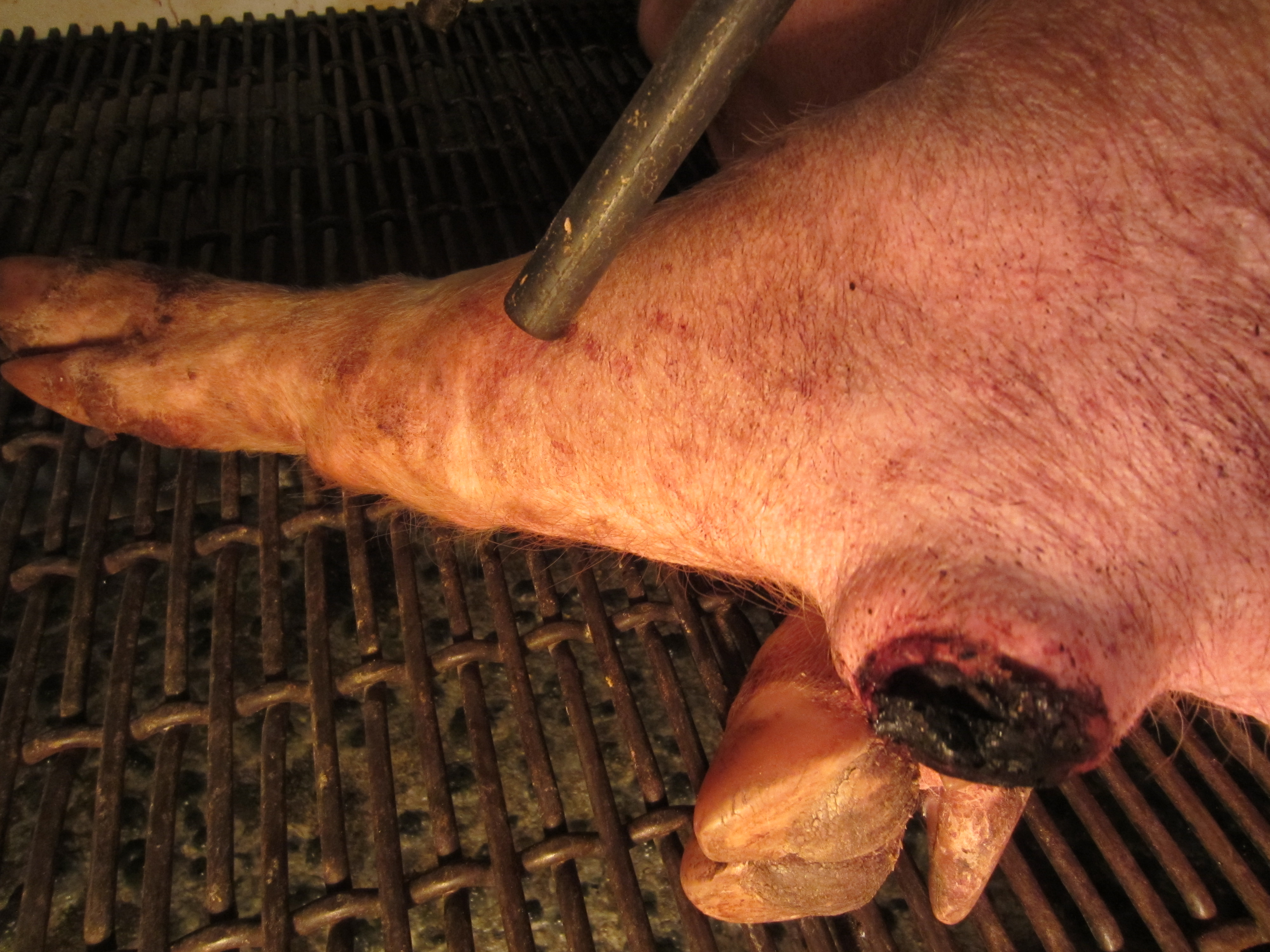
Results of tail docking a piglet at Iowa Select Farms, taken by Mercy for Animals in 2011. Tail-docking is intended to prevent the injuries that can occur when pigs bite each other's tails. Without anesthesia, it causes acute trauma and pain.

Tail-docking in pigs is typically carried out without anesthetic when the piglet is three to four days old, causing acute trauma and pain. Commercially raised domestic pigs kept in close quarters have their tails docked to prevent chewing or biting each other's tails. Pig producers in Brazil and Thailand have stopped tail docking for animal welfare reasons. Routine tail-docking without anesthesia has been illegal in the EU since 1994. The Council Directive 2008/120/EC of 18 December 2008 laying down minimum standards for the protection of pigs prohibited all tail-docking of pigs in the EU. Finland and Sweden have banned and eliminated tail-docking on the member state level, but in the rest of the EU, routine illegal tail-docking of pigs has been continuing with impunity, as pig farmers argue that they do not manage to prevent tail-biting by implementing recommended measures.

== Sheep ==
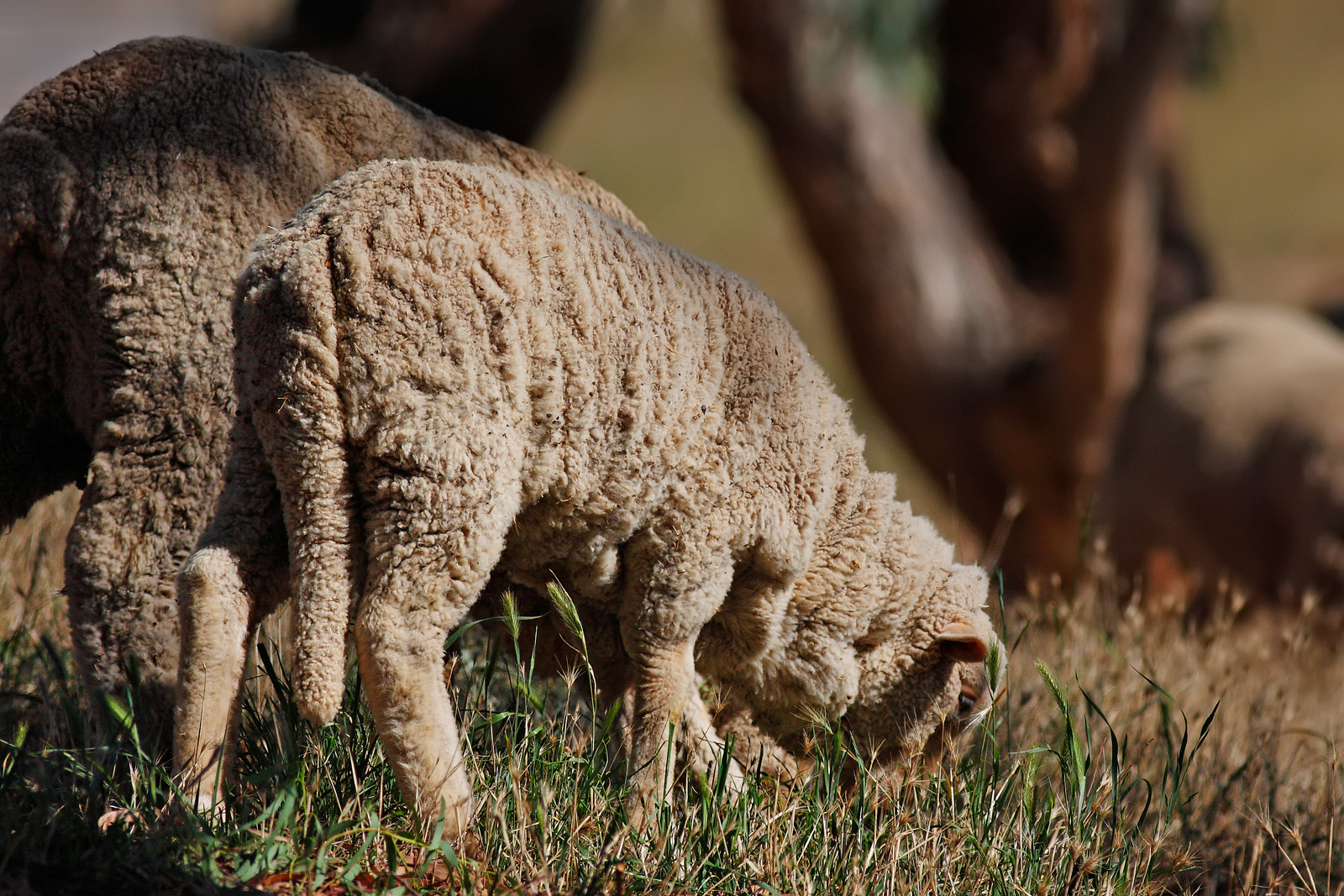
A lamb in Australia which has not had its tail docked. Undocked sheep are not common there.

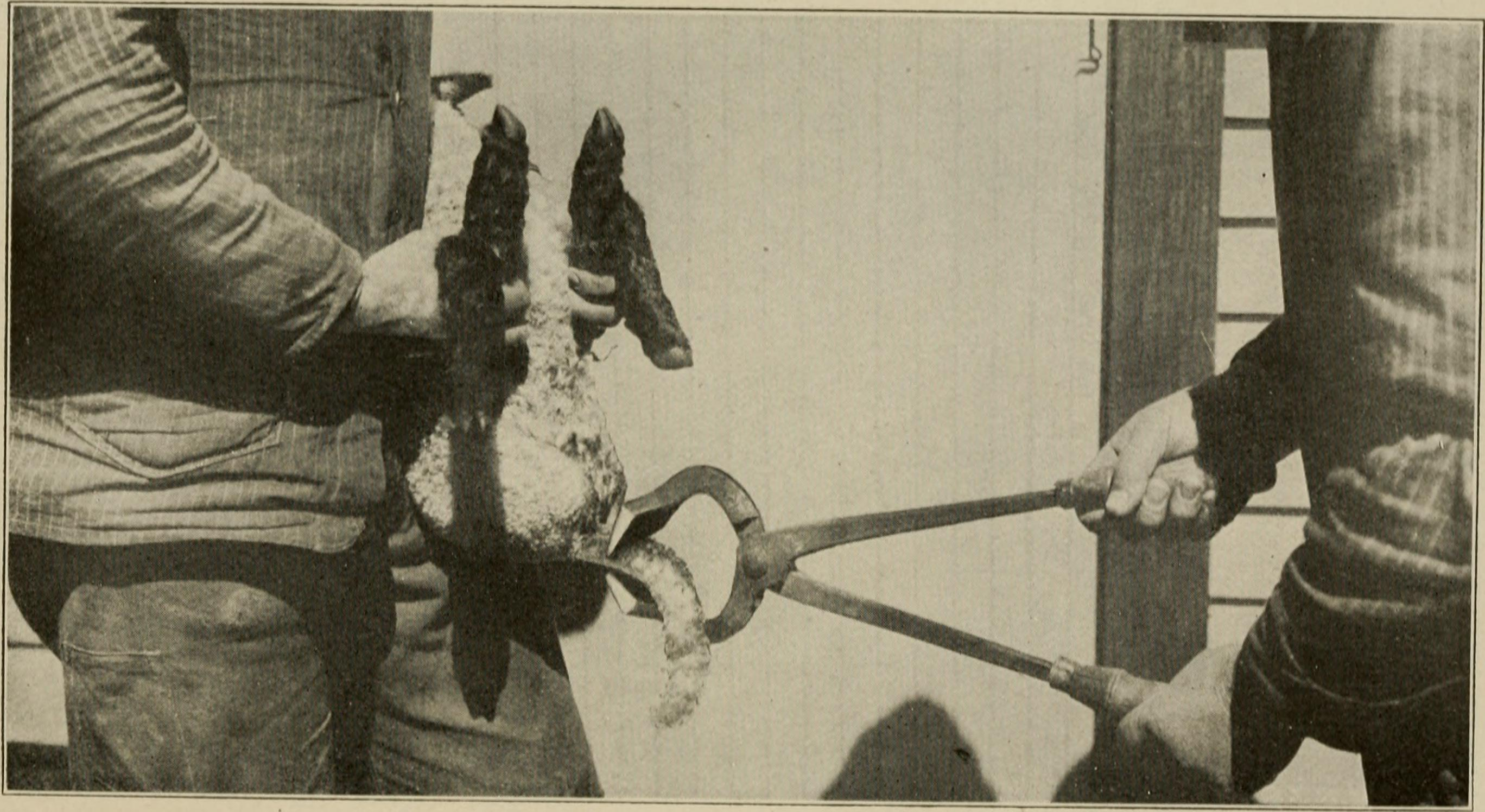
A lamb about to be docked (1920). According to the source, "There is more than one way to dock lambs. Their tails may be cut off with a sharp jack-knife. It used to be the custom to chop them off on a block by means of a chisel and mallet."

Many breeds of sheep have their tails docked to reduce the risk of fly strike. Mulesing is also used for that purpose. Docking also makes it easier to view a grown ewe's udders to detect potential problems.

While tail docking is an effective preventive method in some cases, if it is not carried out correctly it may result in other problems such as ill thrift or rectal prolapse. In lambs, tail docking at the distal end of the caudal folds tends to minimize docking effects on incidence of rectal prolapse. Docking at that length has been recommended by the American Veterinary Medical Association. In the UK, the law states that for sheep, docked tails should at a minimum cover the anus in male lambs, and the vulva in female lambs. These minimum lengths are also recommended in Canada.

Depending on the animal and the culture, docking may be done by cutting (knife or other blade), searing (gas or electrically heated searing iron), or constriction methods, i.e. rubber ring elastration. The Canadian Veterinary Medical Association indicates that pain, stress, recovery time and complications associated with docking of livestock will be minimized by docking when animals are under one week of age. However, docking of lambs within 24 hours of birth is not recommended, as it may interfere with ingestion of colostrum and/or formation of the maternal bond. In the UK the law requires that docking on sheep using constriction methods must be performed within the first week of the animal's life. The UK Farm Animal Welfare Council has noted that this limitation can be problematic in management of hill flocks where normal practice is to handle lambs as little as possible during the first week "to avoid mis-mothering, mis-adventure and injury."

Many breeds of wild sheep naturally have short tails and do not require docking. Sheep having such long tails at all is more a byproduct of human selective breeding over centuries to favor sheep with more wool to shear and sell, which had the additional unintended effect of favoring long, wooly tails as well. With demand for wool remaining depressed with the rise of competitor fibers for clothing, there has been more interest in possibly reversing this unintentional shift, as a sheep's wool has become a comparatively smaller portion of its value. Various projects have researched breeding or using gene editing for shorter tails, which would lessen the need for docking.

== Dogs ==
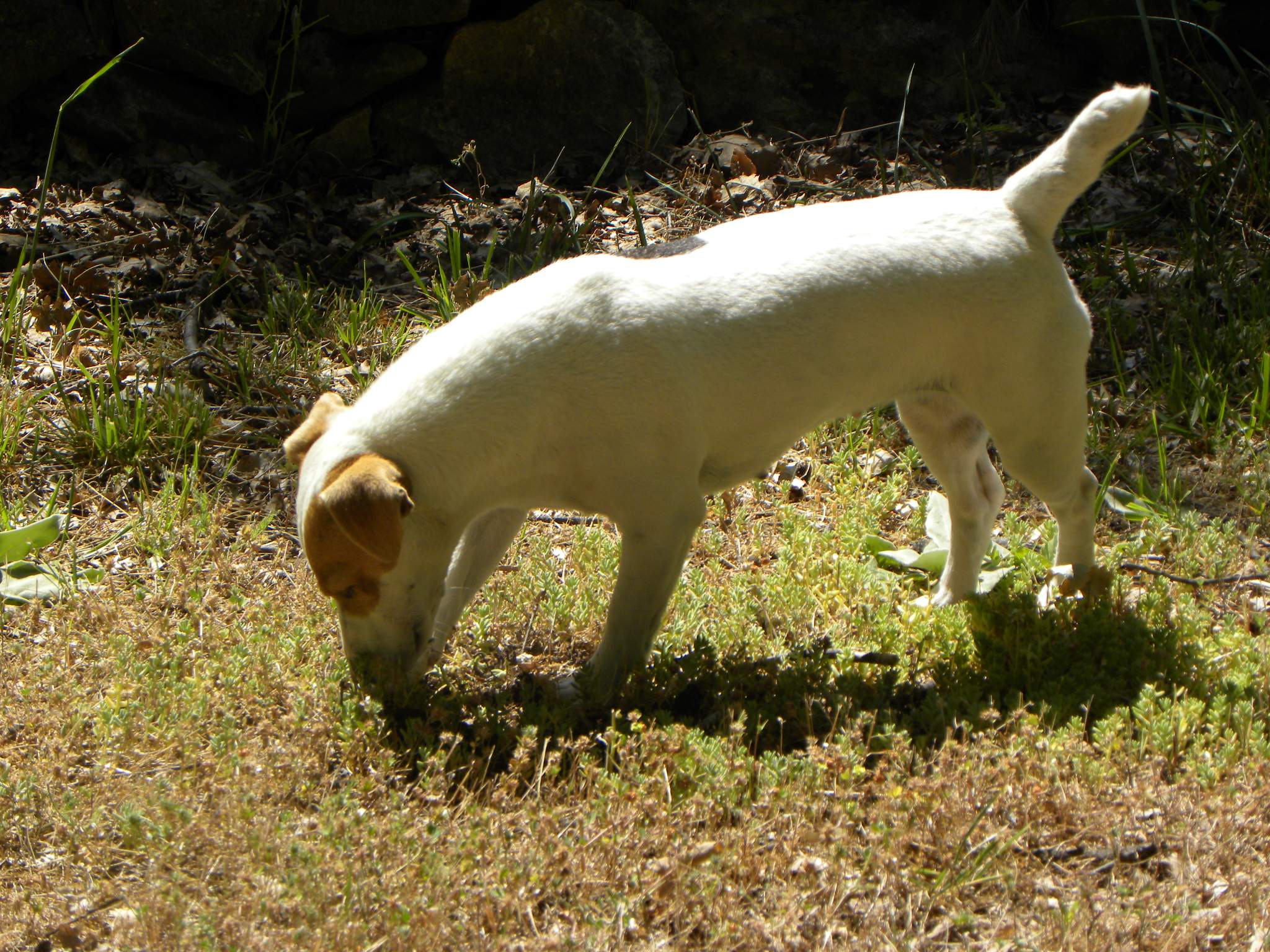
A dog with partially docked tail

As with other domesticated animals, there is a long history of docking the tails of dogs. It is understood to date at least to Ancient Greece. The most popular reason for docking dog breeds is to prevent injury to working dogs. In hunting dogs, the tail is docked to prevent it from getting cut up as the dog wags its tail in the brush. This is contested by a wide range of groups and is sometimes considered a form of animal cruelty. This has led to the practice being outlawed and made illegal throughout many countries, in some of which dogs are no longer bred for work, or used as working animals.

For example, in eighteenth-century England, tail docking became conventional following the implementation of a tax levied against non-working dogs (a docked tail designated status as a working dog). The push for industry regulation, characteristic of the twentieth-century UK, culminated in the passage of the Veterinary Surgeons Act 1966. Therein, tail docking was explicitly declared to be legal and exempt from regulation when performed by persons of or over the age of eighteen—notably before the dog opens its eyes in infancy. A 1991 amendment to the act by Parliament enacted a prohibition of the docking of dogs' tails by lay persons from 1 July 1993 onward—thus abridging the practice to veterinary surgeons only. The passage of this amendment resulted in a response from the Council of the Royal College of Veterinary Surgeons, when in November 1992 the group ruled docking to be unethical "unless for therapeutic or acceptable prophylactic reasons". Critics highlighted that the imperatives, posited by the Royal College, for prophylactic docking were so strict that they made the routine docking of puppies by veterinary surgeons extremely difficult to near impossible. Veterinarians who presently exercise tail docking risk disciplinary action, and can be removed from the professional register. Those found guilty of unlawful docking would face a fine of up to £20,000, up to 51 weeks imprisonment or both. They can only dock the tail of "working" dogs (in some specific cases) – e.g. hunting dogs that work in areas thick in brambles and heavy vegetation where the dog's tail can get caught and cause injury to the dog. Docking was banned in England and Wales by the Animal Welfare Act 2006 and in Scotland by the Animal Health and Welfare (Scotland) Act 2006, with exceptions in England and Wales for dogs under 5 days old of specified breeds bred for specified working purposes, and for medical reasons.

In 1987 the European Convention for the Protection of Pet Animals, established by Council of Europe, prohibited docking for non-medical reasons, though signatory countries are free to opt out of this provision, and almost half of them have done so. Norway completely banned the practice in 1987. Other countries where docking is banned include Australia and the United Kingdom.

== Horses ==
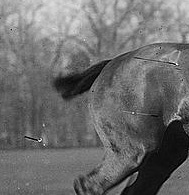
Docked and banged tail on a polo pony, photographed between 1910 and 1915

Originally, most docking was done for practical purposes. For example, a draft horse used for hauling large loads might have had its tail docked to prevent it from becoming entangled in tow ropes, farm machinery, or harness; without docking, it could be dangerous to the horse, painful if the tail were tangled, and inconvenient to the owner to tie up the horse's tail for every use.

In modern use, the term usually does not refer to tail amputation as it does with some dog breeds. However, historically, docking was performed on some horses, often as foals. The practice has been banned in some nations, but is still seen on some show and working draft horses in some places, and is practiced at some PMU operations.

In modern times, the term "docked" or "docking" in reference to the tail of a horse generally refers to the practice of cutting the hair of the tail skirt very short, just past the end of the natural dock of the tail. In particular, the tail is often cut short to keep it from being tangled in a harness.

== Cattle ==
Tail docking of dairy cows is prevalent in some regions. Some anecdotal reports have suggested that such docking may reduce SCC (somatic cell counts in milk) and occurrence of mastitis. However, a study examining such issues found no significant effect of docking on SCC or mastitis frequency or on four measures of cow cleanliness. Although it has been suggested that leptospirosis among dairy farm workers might be reduced by docking cows' tails, a study found that milkers' leptospiral titers were not related to tail docking. The American Veterinary Medical Association opposes "routine tail docking of cattle." Similarly, the Canadian Veterinary Medical Association opposes docking tails of dairy cattle.

Cattle on large Australian cattle stations often have the tail brush (not the dock) cut shorter (banged) before their release; this "bang-tail muster" indicates those having been counted, treated, their current pregnancy status determined, etc.

Tail docking in the dairy industry is prohibited in Denmark, Germany, Scotland, Sweden, the United Kingdom, and some Australian states, as well as California, Ohio, and Rhode Island. Several large organizations within the dairy industry are against tail docking because of the lack of scientific evidence supporting claims benefiting the practice. Scientific studies have demonstrated that there are numerous animal welfare issues with this practice (such as distress, pain, increased activity in pain receptors in the tail stump, abnormal growths of nerve fibers, sensitivity to heat and cold, and clostridial diseases). Fortunately, there is an effective and humane alternative to tail docking, which is switch trimming.

== See also ==
- Cropping (animal) – Removal of portions of an animal's ears
- Debeaking – Trimming of a bird's beak, usually performed on domesticated birds
- Declawing – Surgical removal of an animal's claws
- Dubbing (poultry) – Procedure of removing the comb, wattles and sometimes earlobes of poultry
- Overview of discretionary invasive procedures on animals – Non-therapeutic medical procedures in animals
- Pain in animals
