= National Animal Identification System =

US public health monitoring system for farm animals

The National Animal Identification System, (naisG) is a government-run program in the United States intended to extend government animal health surveillance by identifying and tracking specific animals. Administered at the federal level by the Animal and Plant Health Inspection Service, a branch of the United States Department of Agriculture, NAIS will also be overseen by state animal health boards. While the federal program is voluntary, money received by some states, tribes, and non-profit entities from the USDA through cooperative agreements has been used to make parts or all of the program mandatory.

Critics claim the system will put small farmers out of business, by requiring that farmers pay the cost of registration devices of between $1 and $20 for each animal. Large, corporate factory farms which are connected to vertically integrated, birth-to-death factory ID systems, pay by the herd (and not the individual animal), while small farmers must pay it for each animal.

== Overview ==
The National Animal Identification System covers most livestock species, including cattle, poultry, horses, donkeys, mules, sheep, goats and swine, as well as bison, deer, elk, llamas, alpacas and even some fish species, under the heading of aquaculture. Household pets such as cats and dogs are not included.

The first step in the system is identification of locations, or premises, where these animals are housed or otherwise handled, while identification of the individual animals is the second component. The final part of the program is to track animal movement between the various premises.

The USDA claims the ultimate goal of NAIS is traceback within 48 hours of a diseased animal's movements, which would be possible once the three components of NAIS are fully implemented. This traceback would enable animal health officials to identify all the animals and locations that have had direct contact with the animal and take appropriate measures to prevent the further spread of disease.

=== Premises identification number ===
Premises identification, the first part of NAIS, allows certain information about each premises be entered into a national database, along with a unique, 7-character premises identification number. Information will include: the assigned premises identification number; the name of the premises; its owner or another appropriate contact person; its location, including the street address, city, state, and zip code; a contact phone number; the type of operation, such as a slaughterhouse or horse boarding stable; the date the premises ID number was activated; and the date that the premises ID number was deactivated, along with the reason.

=== Animal identification ===
The next step is animal identification. Each individual animal, whether horse, cow, sheep, chicken, pigeon, etc., is given a unique, 15-character animal identification number, or, in the case of animals that remain together in groups, a unique, 13-character group identification number.

The technology to be used for identification has not yet been finally chosen, although some recommendations have been made by the different species working groups, which represent animal producers. Radio frequency identification (RFID), such as that found in microchips, retinal scanning, and DNA samples are among the possibilities.

=== Animal tracking ===
The final component of NAIS is animal tracking. This would allow a report to be filed each time one of a set of events occurs, such as a change of an animal's ownership or movement to a new premises. A report would include the animal's or group's identification number, the premises identification number where the event took place, the date of the event, and the type of event, as slaughter or a sighting of the animal.

In 2004, the U.S. Government asked farmers to use EID or Electronic Identification ear tags on all their cattle. This request was part of the National Animal Identification System (NAIS) spurred by the discovery of the first case of mad cow disease in the United States. Due to poor performance and concern that other people could access their confidential information, only about 30 percent of cattle producers in the United States tried using EID tags using standards based on the low frequency standards, while the UHF standards are being mandated for use in Brazil, Paraguay, and Korea .

On December 19, 2007, the FDA announced plans to create a database to track cloned animals through the food system and enable an effective labeling process. This system will be part of the National Animal Identification System, which will track all livestock in the United States from farm to fork.

== Benefits ==
NAIS has the ability to make American animal products more marketable overseas. Some countries have restricted the importation of some animal products because of the potential for disease. The European Union doesn't require trading-partner countries to fulfill its traceability requirements, though the EU says common practice among some of its food-business operators is to ask for trading partners to comply with regulation as part of contractual agreements.

== Concerns ==
Some of the concerns with NAIS include financial, civil rights, and religious aspects of the program.

=== Financial costs ===
Financially, a system as vast as NAIS could be extremely costly. Additionally, there is concern that the costs of complying with the program will drive small farmers out of business, due to the cost associated with registering each animal. Small farmers and families that sell off parts of their herds or flocks every year would have to register and pay a registration fee for every head of livestock or poultry, while corporate farms with large herds or flocks that move through the production chain as a group, will only have to pay the fee equivalent of owning one animal.

In this scenario most of the costs of this expensive tracking system will fall on small farms and families, allowing corporate farms increased profits and lower costs. According to the USDA's NAIS User Guide (p27), the cost of the various animal identification devices ranges from as little as $1 to as much as $20. For example, as indicated in that guide, an RFID ear tag costs from $2 to $3, while implantable transponders can cost up to $20, plus associated veterinarian costs. Consider the family chicken farmer, who will have to place a $1 visual tag on each chicken, while the corporate farmer will have to tag only one chicken in each flock, giving the corporate farmer a $1 cost savings per chicken, over the family farmer. This disparity will further tip the scales in favor of corporate farms and give them greater ability to out-compete smaller farms, hastening the demise of the small family farm.

The costs of becoming NAIS compliant for a U.S. beef producer were found to be a minimum of $2.08 a head for large producers and as much as $17.56 a head for smaller operations, with an estimated average cost to cow/calf producers of $6.26 per animal, according to research by Christopher Raphael Crosby of Kansas State University's Department of Agricultural Economics published in 2008. A spreadsheet developed by Kansas State University agricultural economist Kevin C. Dhuyvetter and beef specialist Dale Blasi to calculate the costs of a RFID-based animal identification system, published in July 2005, puts the costs at $7.21 per head for a herd of 250 cattle, based on variables including the cost of tags and hardware such as readers and computers. This produces a large bias of benefit towards the big producers and harms small local farms who bear an undue burden for a program that gives them little to no benefit.

=== Civil rights concerns ===
There are also civil rights concerns, because NAIS establishes extensive government control over livestock, which are considered to be private property. There are also concerns that the big agribusiness companies will use this system to blame their mistakes in processing which introduces contamination to the food supply on small farmers, putting them out of business.

In Wisconsin, the first state to make NAIS mandatory by allowing Premises ID to become law in January 2006, there is the ability to allow for exemptions of small farms. However, this has been denied by the Department of Agriculture, Trade, and Consumer Protection (DATCP) in their rule making. Wisconsin State Statute 95.51 (3m)states that the department may promulgate exemptions based on size and type of farm, ATCP rule No. 17 makes Premises ID completely mandatory and offers no exemptions. Although DATCP Secretary Rod Nilsestuen said in a May 1, 2007 press release that Premises ID is not Animal ID, he does not deny that in September 2005 he wrote to the US House of Representatives Committee on Agriculture, Subcommittee on Livestock and Horticulture (serial number 109-16) that he and DATCP "support the use of RFID technology in all livestock species as deemed effective and appropriate by the NAIS Species Working Groups."

Other concerns in Wisconsin and other states (who contract with WLIC) is that the system is not maintained by state government, but instead relies upon the Wisconsin Livestock Identification Consortium (WLIC) to maintain the database of Premises ID registrants. This is currently continuing with the RFID tagging database as well. The WLIC is a private interest group made up of Big Agribusiness, including Cargill, Genetics/Biotech Corporations, like ABS Global, and RFID tagging companies such as Digital Angel, and many of these members parallel NIAA membership. There are also in fact only 6 RFID tags that are approved by WLIC/NAIS at this time: 2 manufactured by Allflex, 2 by Digital Angel, one by Y-Tex and 1 by Global Animal Management. All four are WLIC members.

=== Religious concerns ===
Finally, fears persist about plans to make NAIS mandatory on the federal level, which would threaten the religious freedom of those who believe that making a “mark” is sinful, such as the Amish. The Amish also object to the use of electronic devices such as microchips. If microchip implants were required, as has been proposed in a 2004 report by the United States Animal Health Association’s Committee on Livestock Identification, it would also violate the rights of those who believe that this practice is morally wrong.

== Other countries ==
The European Union introduced its Trade Control and Expert System, or TRACES, in April 2004. The system provides a central database to track movement of animals within the EU and from third countries. In the EU, animals must be tagged with details of their origin and stamped with the traceability code of the abattoir when slaughtered. The tools used may vary from one country to another and can include ear tags, passports and bar codes, but must carry the same information.

Australia's National Livestock Identification System, or NLIS, is used to identify and track livestock from property of birth to slaughter using RFID devices and a central electronic database of an animal’s residency and animals it has interacted with. The government claims the system improves food safety and access to export markets, and assists with disease management. Farmers must register their property if they hold one or more heads of livestock including horses, cattle, sheep, goats, pigs, deer and camels, though the NLIS will not confirm ownership of livestock. The system originates from a cattle-tracing system introduced in Australia in the 1960s to help fight bovine tuberculosis. The Australian system has over 11,000,000 phantom livestock in the system that do not exist. This system costs farmers money because of the increased handling time and lost margins when tags do not match in the system resulting in lower payments to farmers.

New Zealand is planning a similar National Animal Identification and Tracing system.

== See also ==
- Animal welfare in the United States
- Ear tag
- Microchip implant (animal)
- United States Animal Identification Plan
- National Farm Animal Identification and Records
