= Holstein Association USA =

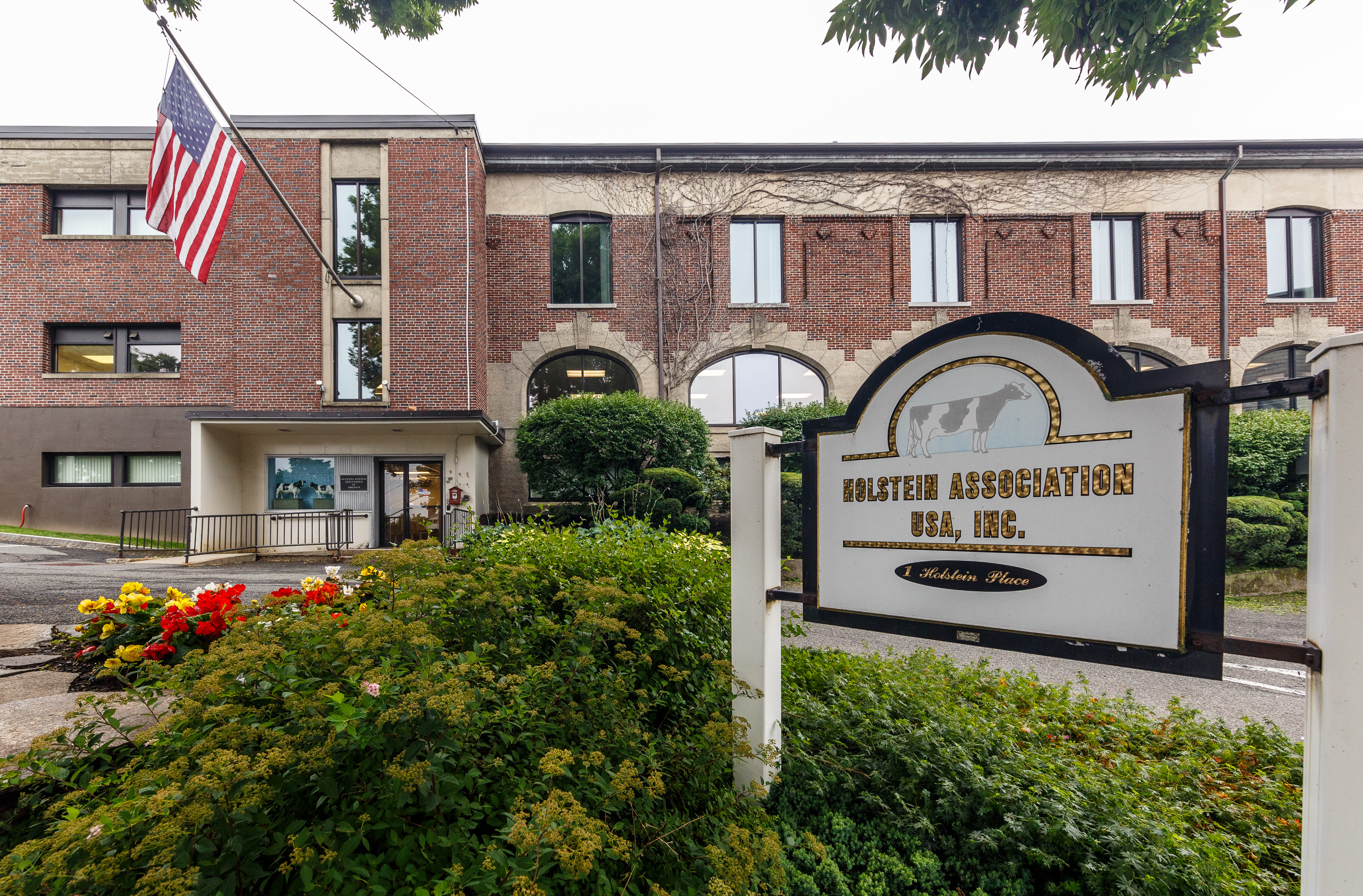
- Brattleboro headquarters
- Founded: 1885 (141 years ago)
- Headquarters: Brattleboro, Vermont
- Location: U.S.
- Region served: United States
- Website: https://www.holsteinusa.com/
- Formerly called: Holstein–Friesian Association of America (1885–1994)

The Holstein Association USA is the world's largest dairy breed association. With over 22 million registered Holstein Friesian cattle, the association was established in 1885 as the Holstein–Friesian Association of America, a merger of several Friesian breeder associations. It was given its current name in 1994.

The association, which is headquartered in Brattleboro, Vermont, provides programs, products and services to dairy producers, with the aim being to enhance genetics and improve profitability. As part of the process, animal identification and ear tags are provided, along with genomic testing, mating programs, processing of dairy records, classification and Holstein semen. It processes almost 400,000 registrations per year, plus around 70,000 transfers.

In 1999, the association established the National Farm Animal Identification and Records (FAIR) animal identification program.

The association's motto is To provide leadership, information and services to help members and dairy producers worldwide be successful.
