= Earmark =

Earmark may refer to:

- Earmark (agriculture), cuts or marks in the ears of animals made to show ownership
- Earmark (politics), a legislative provision that directs funds to be spent on specific projects
- Earmark (finance), a requirement that a source of revenue be devoted to a specific public expenditure

== See also ==
- Accountable Fundraising
