= BCMS =

BCMS may stand for:

- Bosnian-Croatian-Montenegrin-Serbian or Serbo-Croatian, a pluricentric South Slavic language
- Boston Chamber Music Society, an American organization of musicians in Boston, Massachusetts
- British Cattle Movement Service, the organisation responsible for maintaining a database of all bovine animals in Great Britain
- Bible Churchmen's Missionary Society, the previous name of Crosslinks, an evangelical Anglican missionary society
- Business Continuity Management System, a concept in Business continuity planning
