= National Livestock Identification System =

Australian livestock management system

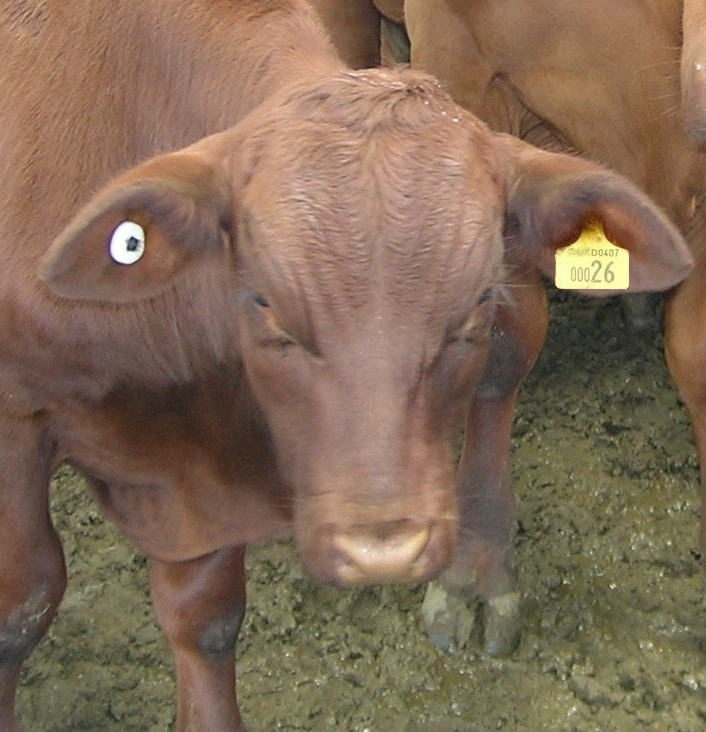
White NLIS RFID tag and a yellow herd management tag

The National Livestock Identification System (NLIS) is a livestock identification and tracking system used in Australia. It is administered by Integrity Systems Company, which is a wholly owned subsidiary of Meat and Livestock Australia.

The system uses Radiofrequency Identification Devices (RFID) applied as ear tags to identify and track livestock, each assigned an individual and unique electronic and physical printed tag numbers. There is an associated central electronic database which is used to record each animal's residency and keep track of the other animals it has interacted with. The system improves food safety, acts as a market export assurance program which improves Australia's access to foreign export markets, and assists with disease control, tracing and management. Farmers must register their property with their local jurisdictional government if they hold one or more heads of livestock. Livestock includes cattle, sheep, goats, pigs, camels, deer, alpacas, llamas, horses and poultry; although State and Territory definitions of "livestock" may differ. NLIS does not confirm ownership of livestock. The system originates from a cattle-tracing system introduced in Australia in the 1960s to help fight bovine tuberculosis, which was officially successfully eradicated in Australia on 31 December 1997.

The NLIS RFID system was introduced in New South Wales on 1 July 2004, and in Queensland on 1 July 2005, replacing the previous tail tag system for cattle. The approved RFID devices used are the commonly used ear tags or alternatively a rumen bolus.

Similar systems exist in other countries such as the National Animal Identification System in the United States, the British Cattle Movement Service and the proposed National Animal Identification and Tracing in New Zealand.

== See also ==
- Agriculture in Australia
- Ear tag
- Microchip implant (animal)
