= National Animal Identification and Tracing Act 2012 =

New Zealand Parliament
- Passed: 2012
- Royal assent: 20 February 2012
- Administered by: Ministry for Primary Industries

Legislative history
- Introduced by: David Carter
- First reading: 14 December 2010
- Second reading: 06 September 2011
- Third reading: 15 February 2012

Amended by
- National Animal Identification and Tracing Amendment Act 2019
- Status: Current legislation

The National Animal Identification and Tracing Act 2012 is an Act of parliament in New Zealand. The Act's stated purpose is to "establish an animal identification and tracing system" in New Zealand.

The National Animal Identification and Tracing (NAIT) system is designed to create a database of animals in New Zealand to track them from birth to live export or slaughter. The Act is administered by the Ministry for Primary Industries and forms part of the statutes governing biosecurity laws in New Zealand.

For the purpose of enforcement, it has been used to infringe a person for a sum of $150 for failing to declare the movement of an animal.

== See also ==
- National Animal Identification and Tracing
- Biosecurity in New Zealand
