= Earmark (agriculture) =

Cut or mark in the ear of livestock animals

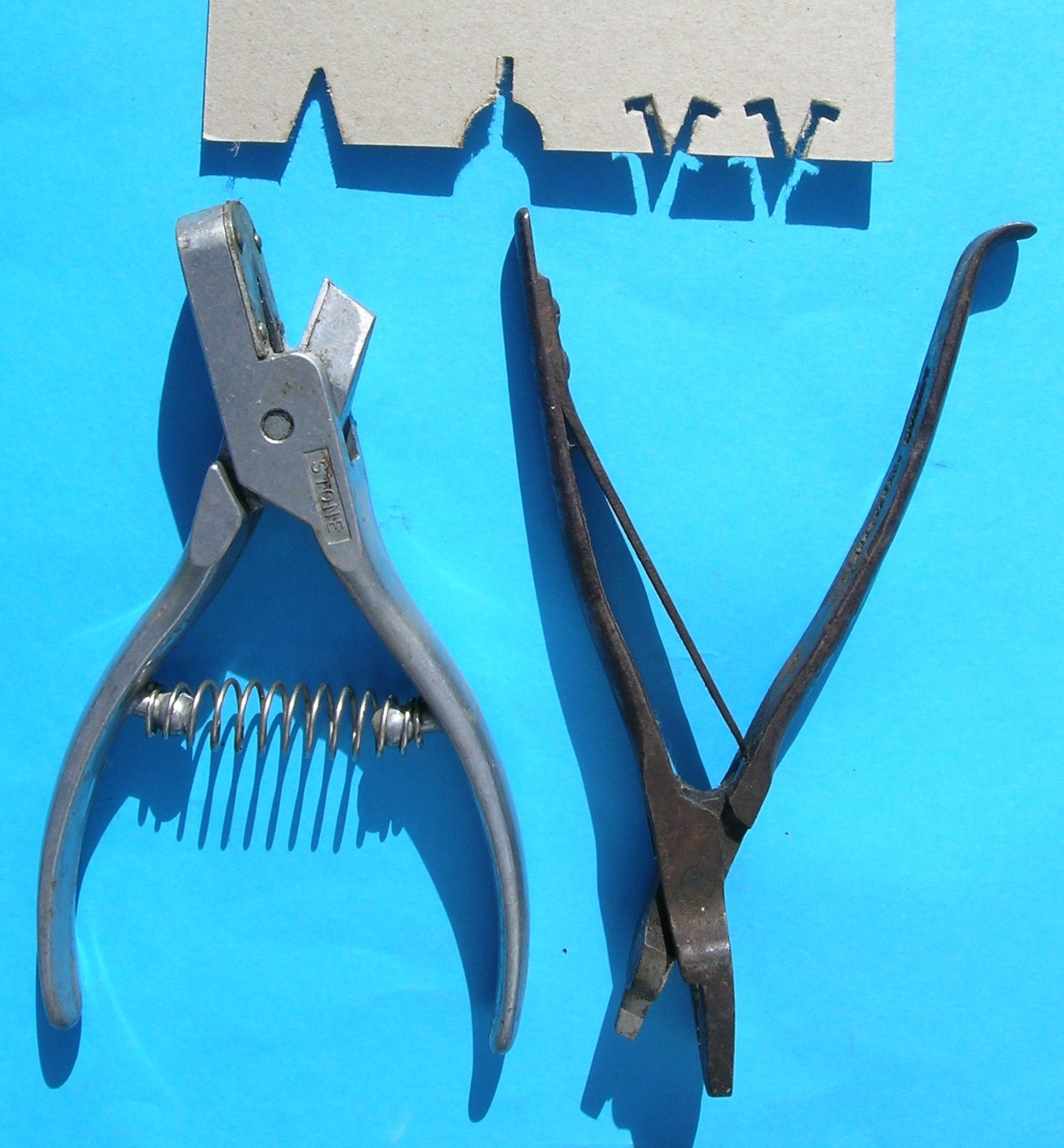
L-R: swallowtail, half halfpenny and slit; and double L earmarks with the earmarkers designed for sheep.

Cattle being earmarked and electrically branded

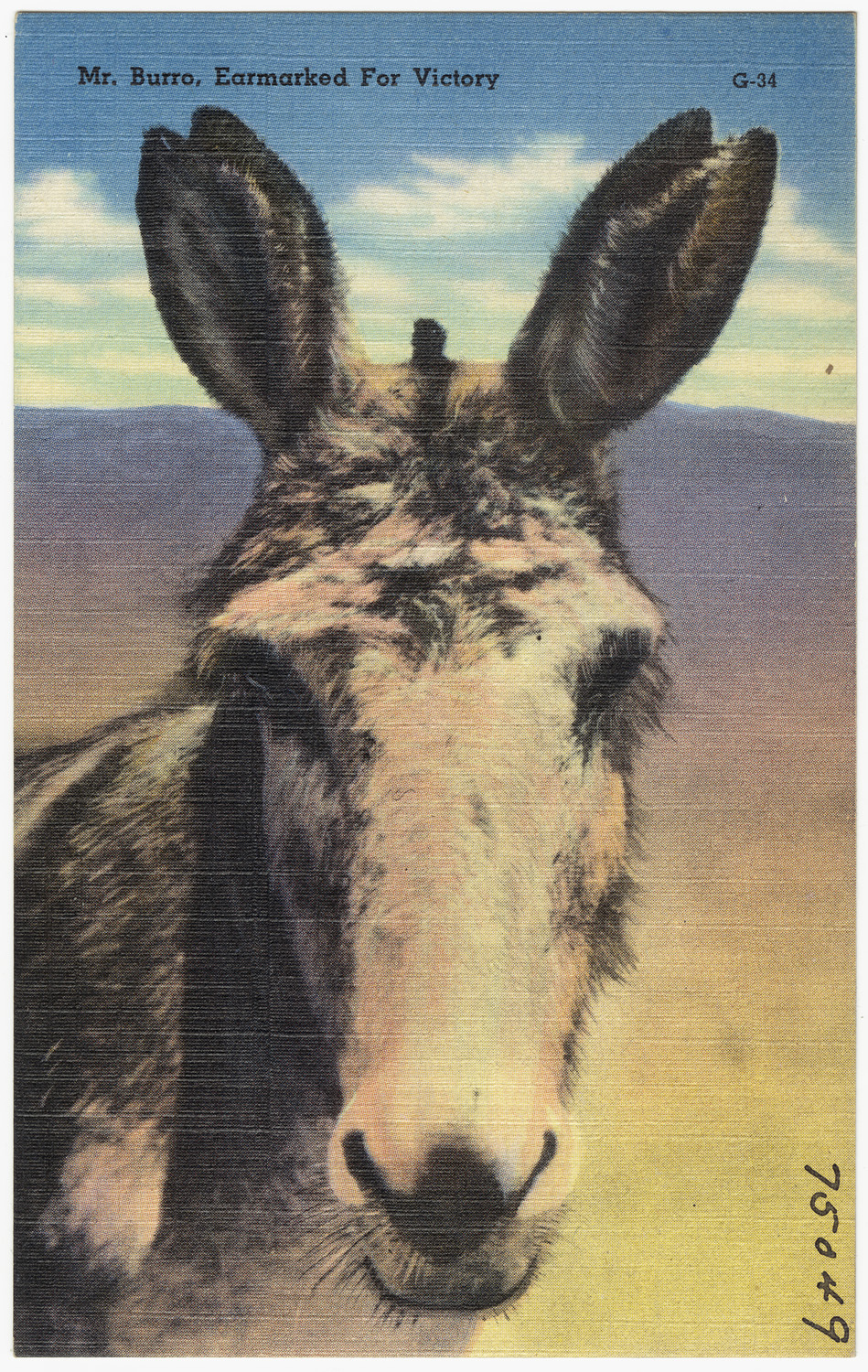
An earmarked donkey

An earmark is a cut or mark in the ear of livestock animals such as cattle, deer, pigs, goats, camels or sheep, made to show ownership, year of birth or sex.

The term dates to the 16th century in England. For example, in a case of defamation in King's Bench in 1541, the defamatory statement included "George Butteler hath eremarked a mare of one Robert Hawk." The practice existed in the Near East up to the time of Islam. Against this, in Q. 4:119 the Qur'an quotes the Devil promising, ""I will mislead them, I will entice them, I will command them to mark the ears of livestock, and I will command them to distort the creation of God."

Earmarks are typically registered when a stock owner registers a livestock brand for their use. There are many rules and regulations concerning the use of earmarks between states and countries. Tasmanian sheep and cattle must be earmarked before they become six months old.

Generally the owner’s earmark is placed in a designated ear of a camel or sheep to indicate its gender. Typically if a registered earmark is used, it must be applied to the right ear for ewes and the left ear for female camels. The other ear of a sheep then may be used to show the year of its birth. Cattle earmarks are often a variety of knife cuts in the ear as an aid to identification, but it does not necessarily constitute proof of ownership.

Since the 1950s it has been more common to use ear tags to identify livestock because coloured tags are capable of conveying more information than earmarks. Such ear tags were popularised by New Zealand dairy farmers in the earliest successful use of them.

Because of the ubiquity of earmarking, in the nineteenth and twentieth centuries, it became common parlance to call any identifying mark an earmark. In early times many politicians were country or farming folk and were adept at using such words in different ways and in creating new concepts.

Today it is common to refer to an institution's ability to designate funds for a specific use or owner as an earmark.

== Laboratory animals ==
Laboratory mice are often kept with several animals in one cage since mice are social animals, therefore it is necessary to have some method of identifying them individually. Earmarks may be used, although non-traumatic methods such as tattooing their tails and painting spots on white mice with crystal violet or permanent markers can be used as well. Microchips are less commonly used in mice because of their expense compared to the short life span of a mouse.

Earmarking a mutant strain of mice called MRL/MpJ led to the accidental discovery that they had the ability to regenerate tissue very quickly, when scientists working with them found that the holes punched in their ears kept growing back. The holes healed over completely with regenerated cartilage, blood vessels, and skin with hair follicles. It was later found that this strain of mice also heals damage to other body parts such as knee cartilage and heart muscle significantly better than other mice.

== See also ==
- Animal identification
- British Cattle Movement Service
- Ear tag
- Livestock branding
- Overview of discretionary invasive procedures on animals
