= National Farm Animal Identification and Records =

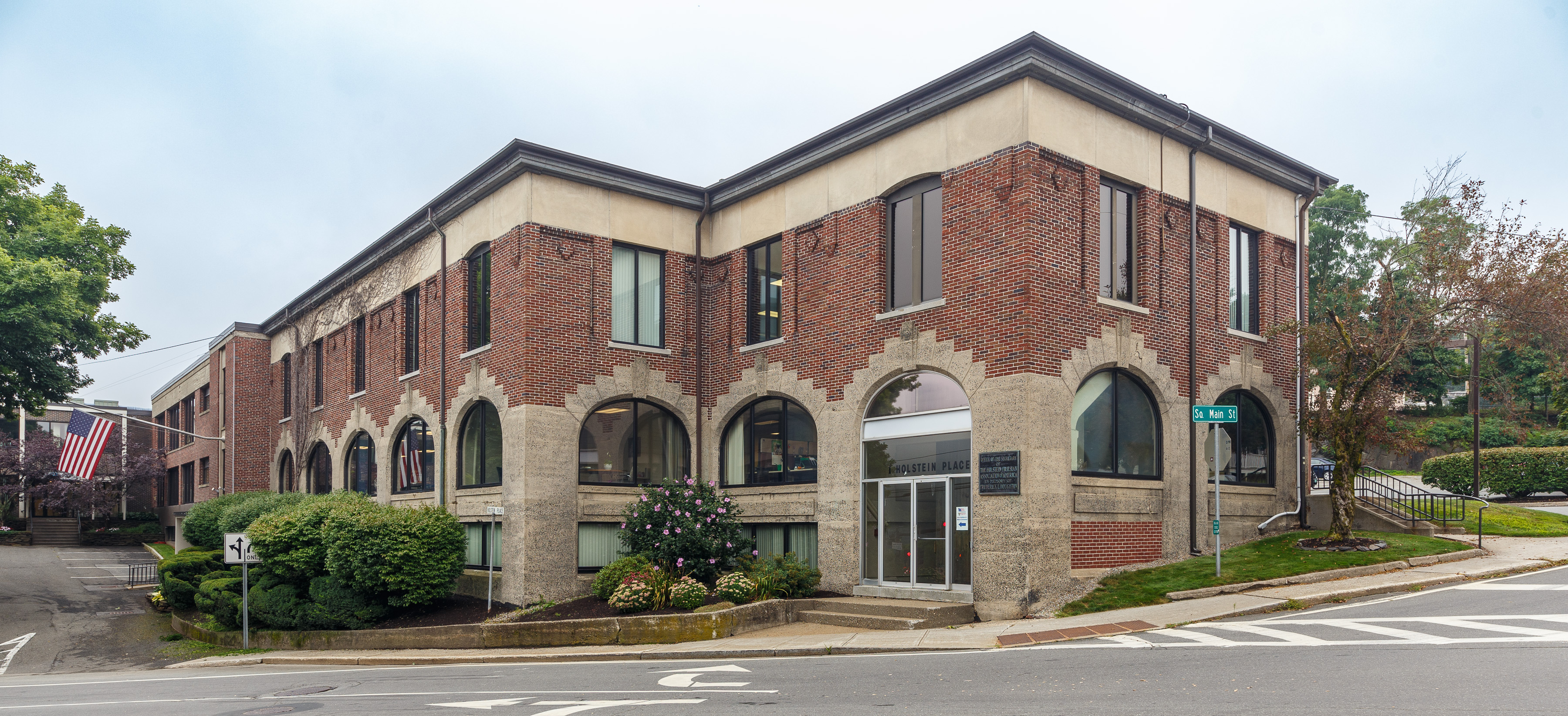
Holstein Association USA

National Farm Animal Identification and Records (FAIR) is a pilot animal identification program established in 1999 by Holstein Association USA; it has received funding through USDA's Animal and Plant Health Inspection Service.

National FAIR is a national animal identification and traceability system. The database is USDA-certified as an official Animal Tracking Database (ATD). National FAIR is also a distributor of official 840 RFID eartags. Millions of animals and thousands of farms across the United States are enrolled because of its simple, cost effective, fast and accurate animal traceability capabilities.
