= Animal identification =

Process done to identify and track animals

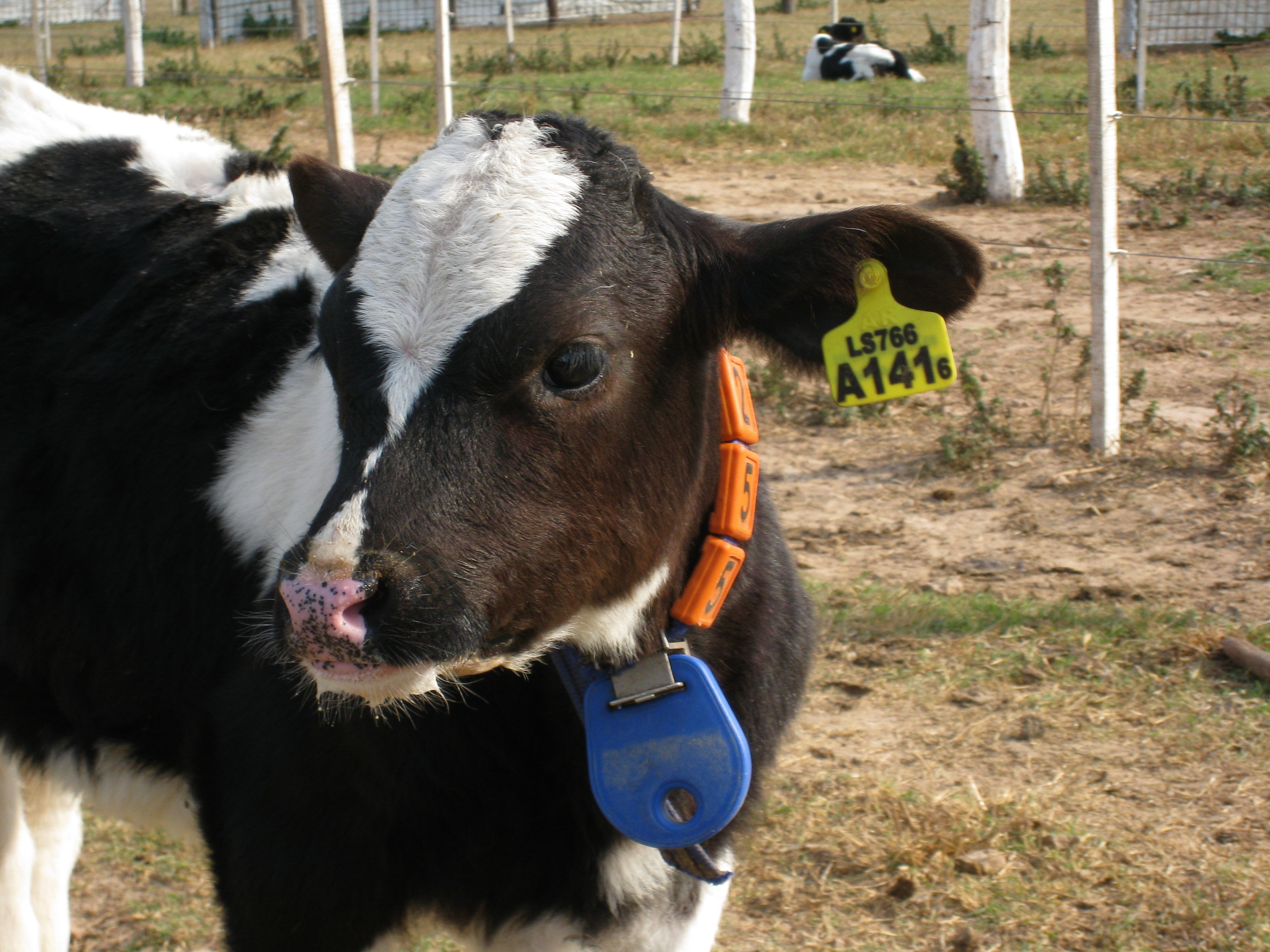
Calf identified with ear tag and transponder

Animal identification using external marks or internal identifiers is a process done to identify and track specific animals. It is done for a variety of reasons including verification of ownership, biosecurity control, and tracking for research or agricultural purposes.

== History ==
Individual identification of animals by means of body markings has been practiced for over 3,800 years, as stated in Code of Hammurabi. The first official identification systems are documented as far as the 18th century. In Uruguay for instance maintained at that time a register of hot brands.

== Noninvasive methods ==
=== Wildlife photo-identification ===
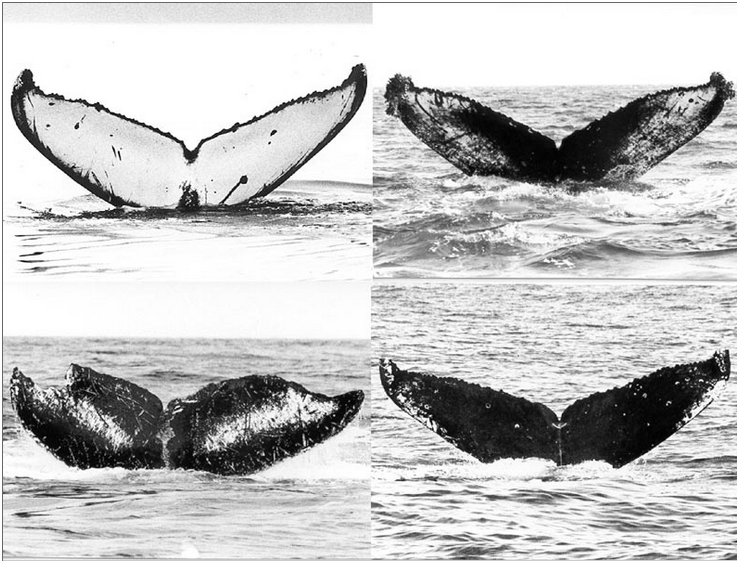
Researchers use variation on humpback whale flukes to identify and track the animals

Photo-identification is a technique used to identify and track individuals of a wild animal study population over time. It relies on capturing photographs of distinctive characteristics such as skin or pelage patterns or scars from the animal. In cetaceans, the dorsal fin area and tail flukes are commonly used.

Photo-identification is generally used as an alternative to other, invasive methods of tagging that require attaching a device to each individual. The technique enables precise counting, rather than rough estimation, of the number of animals in a population. It also allows researchers to perform longitudinal studies of individuals over many years, yielding data about the lifecycle, lifespan, migration patterns, and social relationships of the animals.

Species that are studied using photo-identification techniques include:

- Killer whales
- Humpback whales
- Whale sharks
- Manta rays - see Manta Matcher
- Octopuses (Wunderpus photogenicus)
- Salamanders
- Giraffes

=== Biometrics ===
Rather than tags or tattoos, biometric techniques may be used to identify individual animals: zebra stripes, blood vessel patterns in rodent ears, muzzle prints, bat wing patterns, primate facial recognition and koala spots have all been tried.

== Birds ==
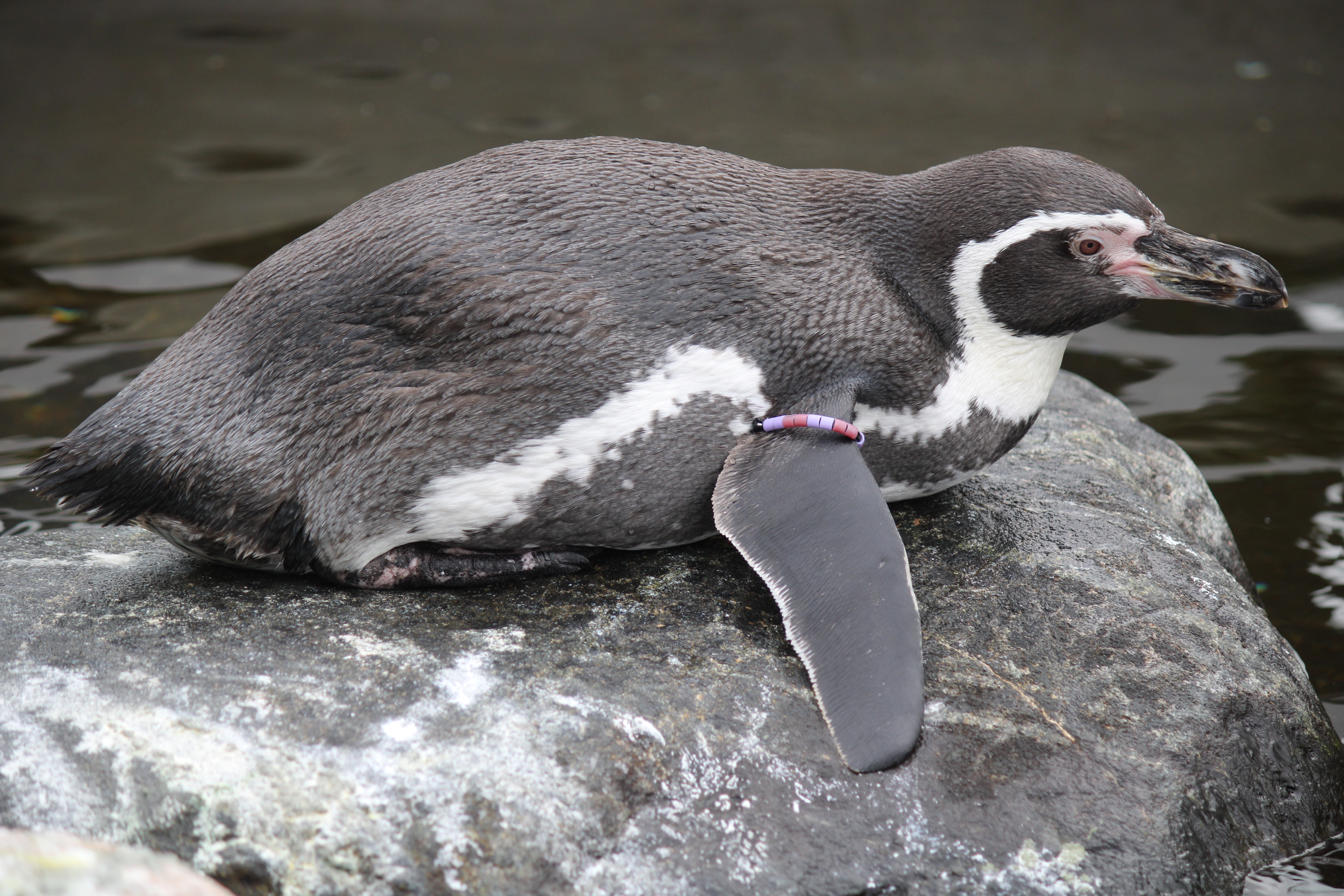
Humboldt penguin with a wing tag at Copenhagen Zoo, Denmark

- Leg rings
- Wing tags
- Microchip implants (parrots)
- Telemetry (falconry birds)

== Domesticated mammals ==
=== Sheep ===
- Freeze branding
- Branding (hot-iron)
- Collar
- Earmarking
- Ear tags (non-electronic)
- Ear tags (electronic)
- Semi-permanent paint

=== Pigs ===
- Collars (electronic and non-electronic)
- Earmarking
- Ear tags (non-electronic)
- Ear tags (electronic)
- Semi-permanent paint
- Tattoo (see animal tattoo)

=== Horses ===
- Collars (non-electronic)
- Branding (hot-iron)
- Branding (freeze)
- Microchip implants
- Lip tattoo

=== Cattle ===
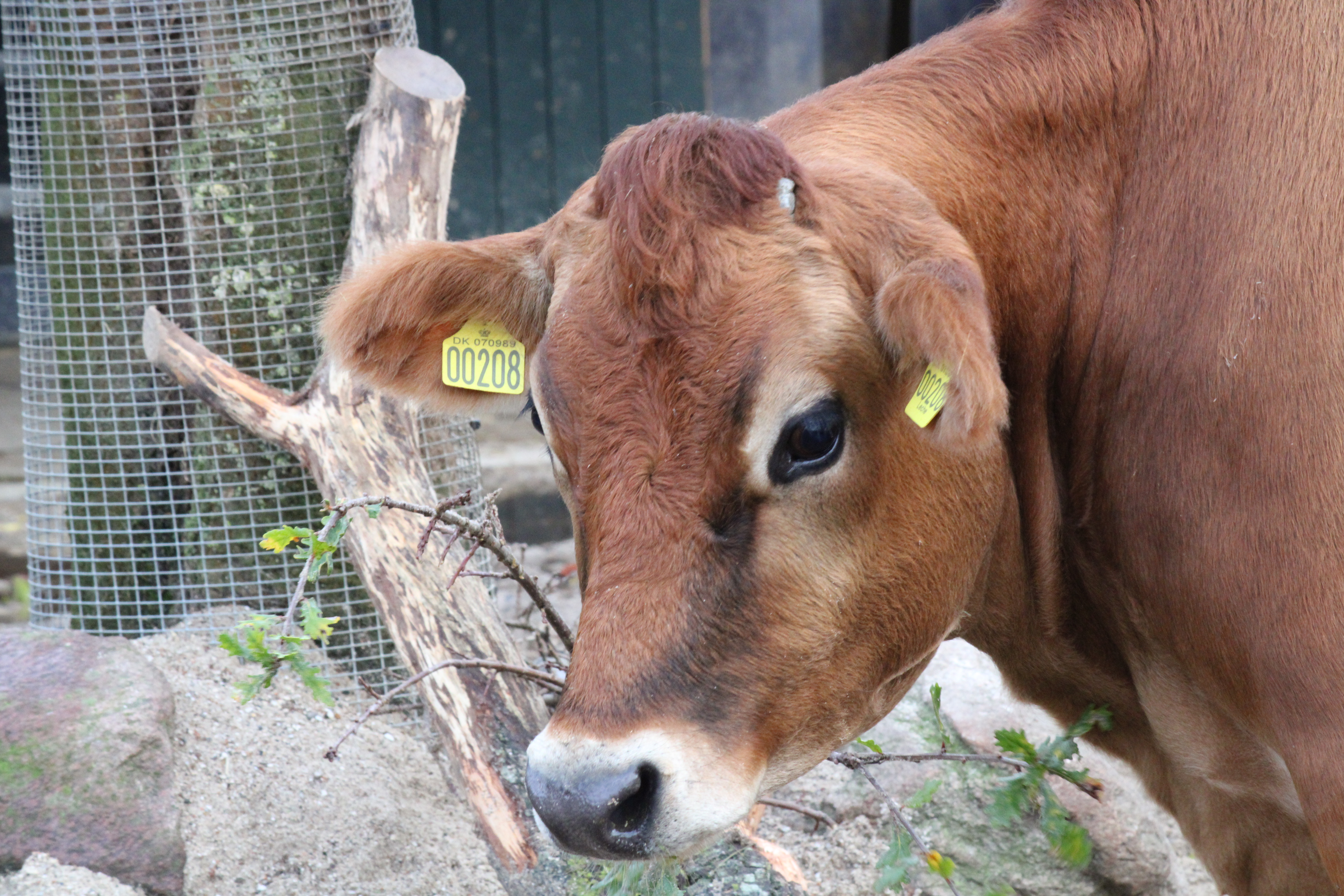
Tagged limousin

- Anklets
- Branding (freeze)
- Branding (hot-iron)
- Collars (electronic and non-electronic)
- Earmarking
- Ear tags (non-electronic)
- Ear tags (electronic)
- Rumen bolus (electronic)
- Cowbell
- Photo-identification of noses

=== Dogs ===
- Collar
- Microchip implants
- Tattoo

=== Laboratory rodents ===
- Earmarking (notching or punching)
- Ear tags (nickel, copper or scannable 2D barcode tags)
- Microchip implants
- Hair dye
- Toe clipping (Note: 'Toe clipping' in mice involves the full or partial amputation of one or more digits as a means of permanent identification.)
- Manual tattoos (tail, foot pad or ears)
- Automated tail tattoos

== Wild mammals ==
=== Bats ===
- Photo-identification of wing membranes

=== Koalas ===
- Photo-identification of noses

=== Giraffes ===
- Photo-identification

=== Zebras ===
- Photo-identification of stripes

=== Marine mammals ===
- Transponders
- Adhesive tags
- Fin photographs
- Fluke photographs

== Fish ==
- Microchip implants
- Fin clipping
- Coded wire tag
- Passive integrated transponder
- Acoustic tag
- Visible implant elastomer (VIE)

== Sharks ==
- Photo-identification

== Amphibians ==
- Microchip implants
- Toe clippings
- Passive integrated transponder
- Visible implant elastomer (VIE)
- Photo-identification

== Invertebrates ==
- Adhesive tags
- Semi-permanent paint
- Photo-identification

== National animal identification schemes ==
- British Cattle Movement Service in Britain
- National Animal Identification and Tracing in New Zealand
- National Animal Identification System in the United States
- National Livestock Identification System in Australia

== Gallery ==
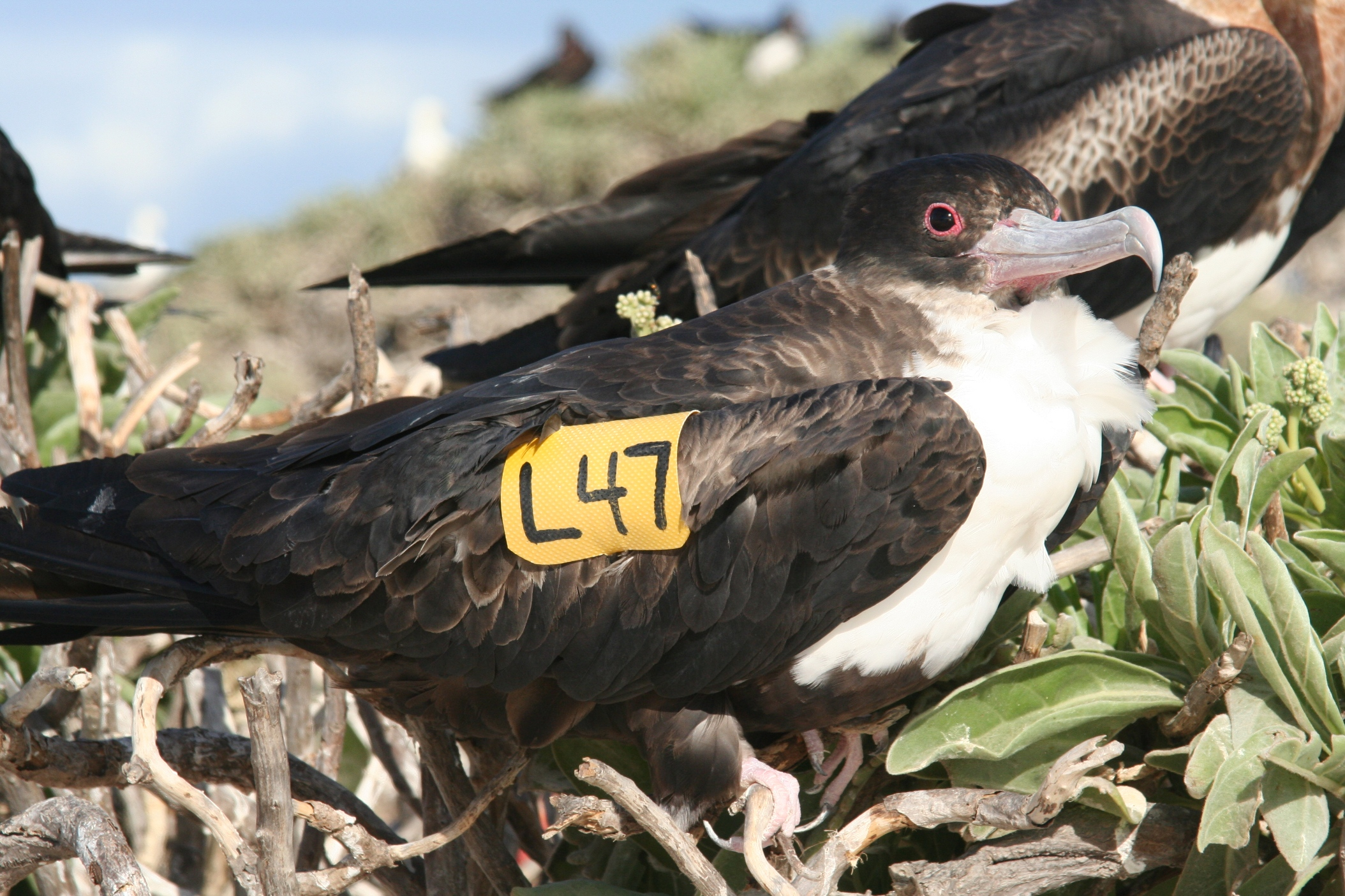
Great frigatebird with a wing tag

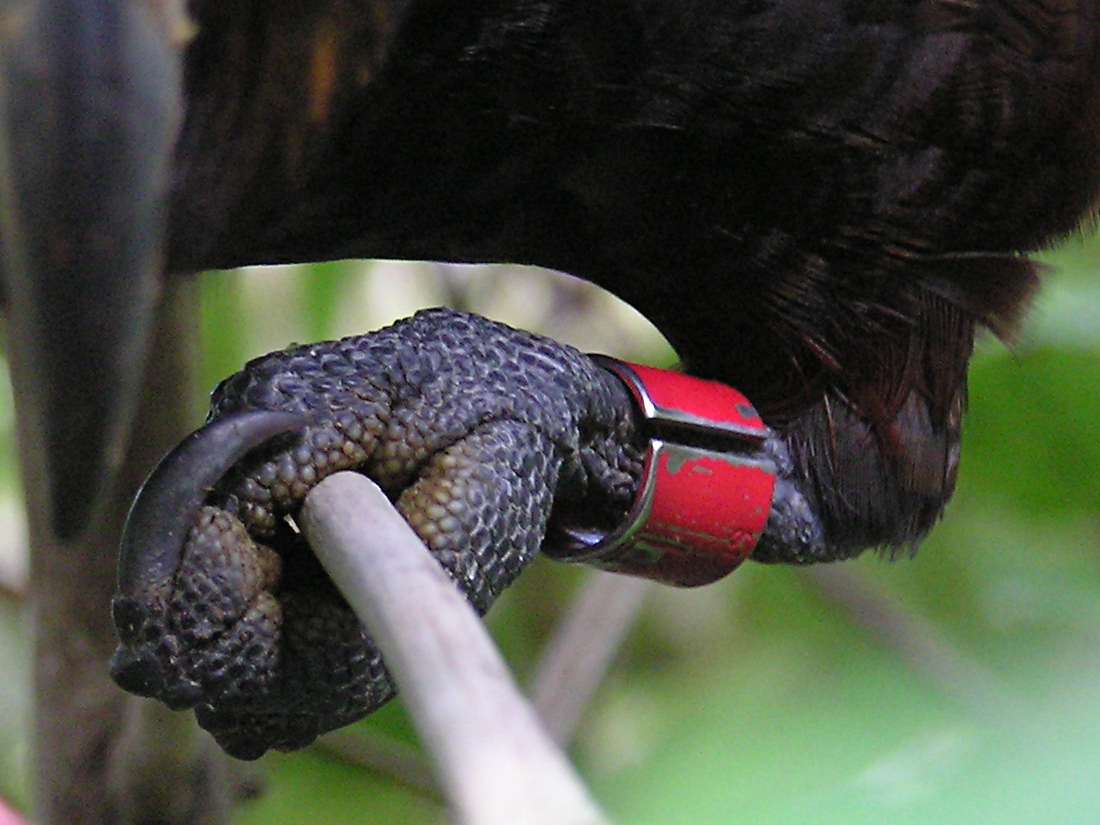
Bird ring

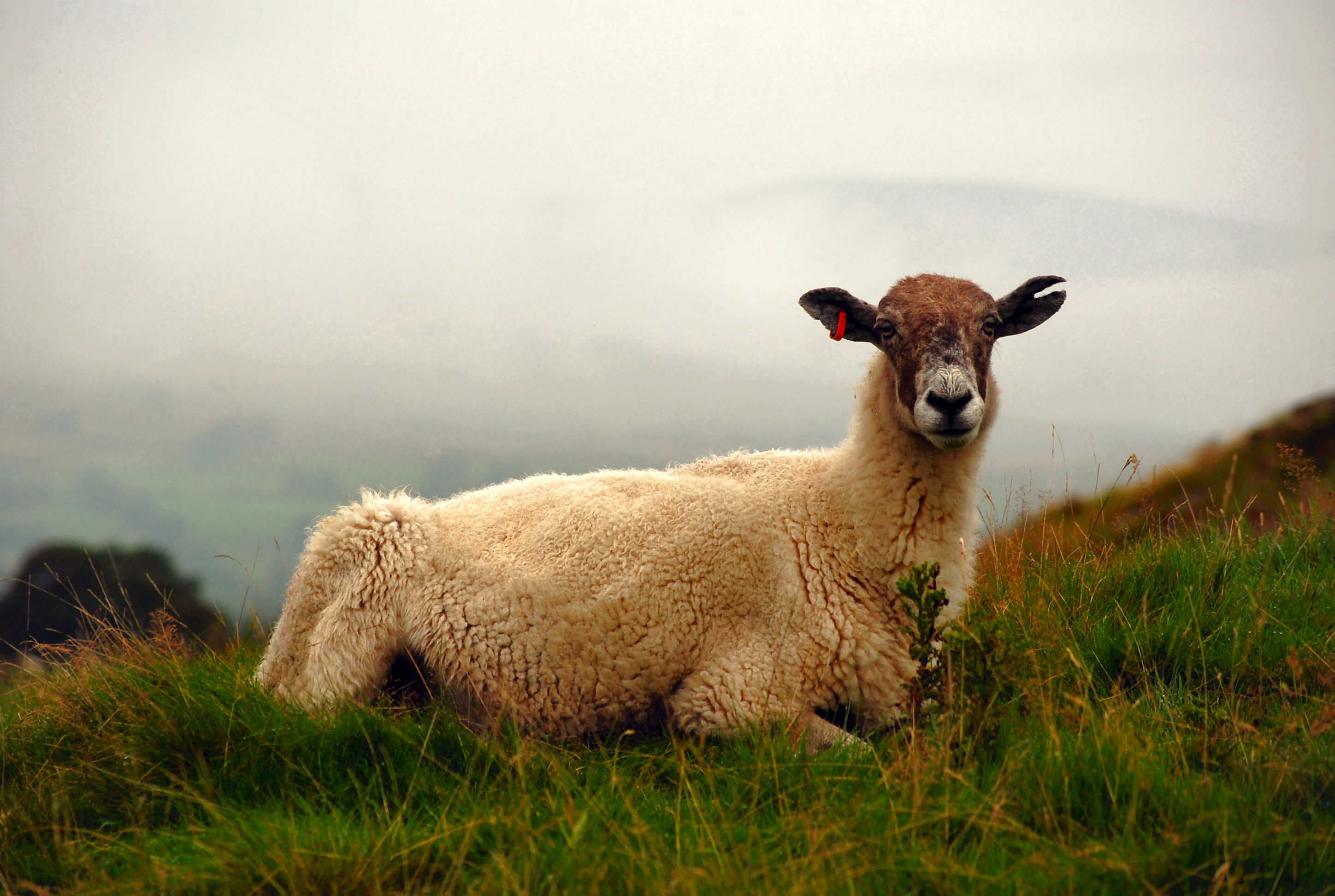
Sheep with an earmark

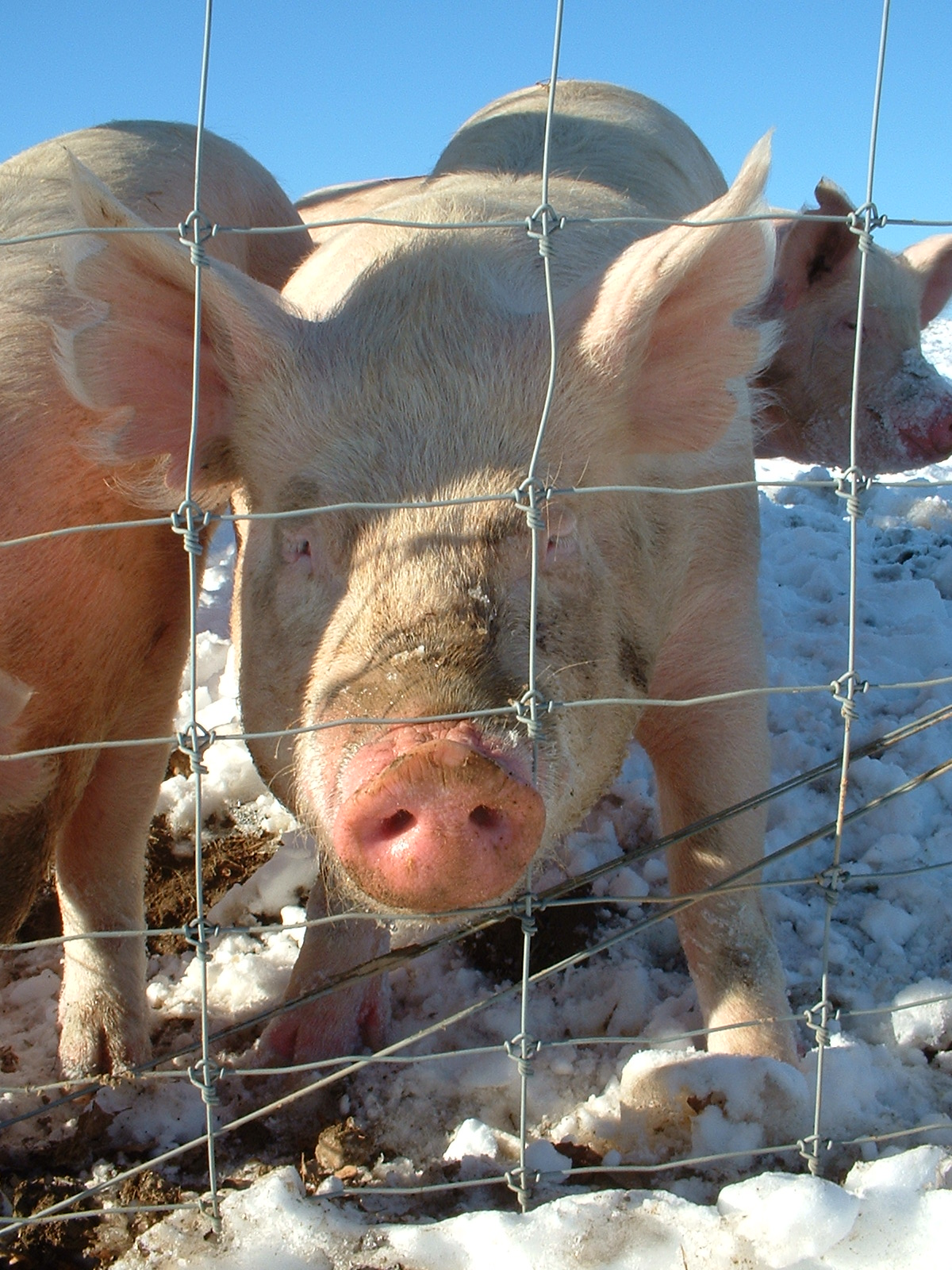
Pig with earmark

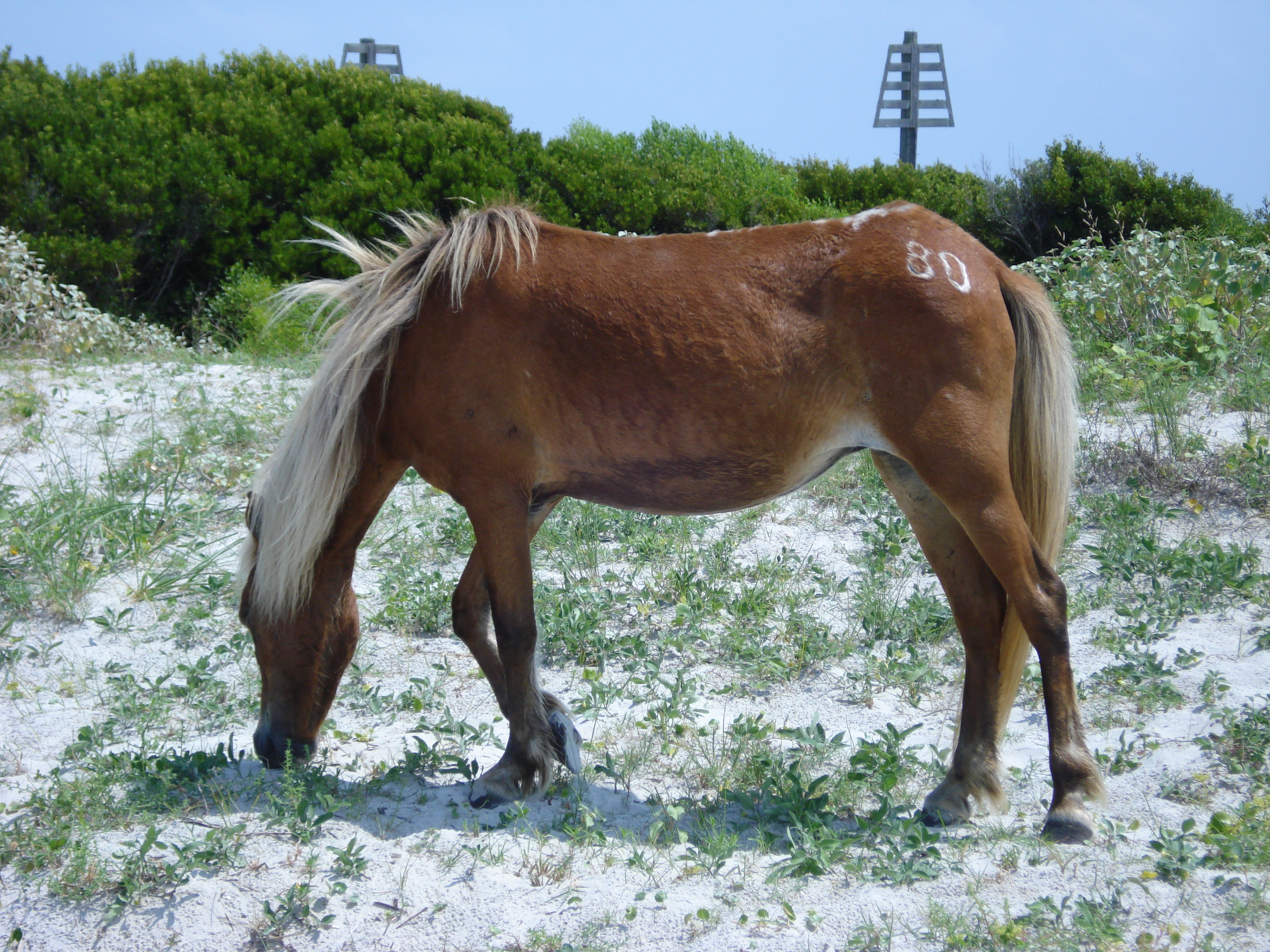
Horse with a brand

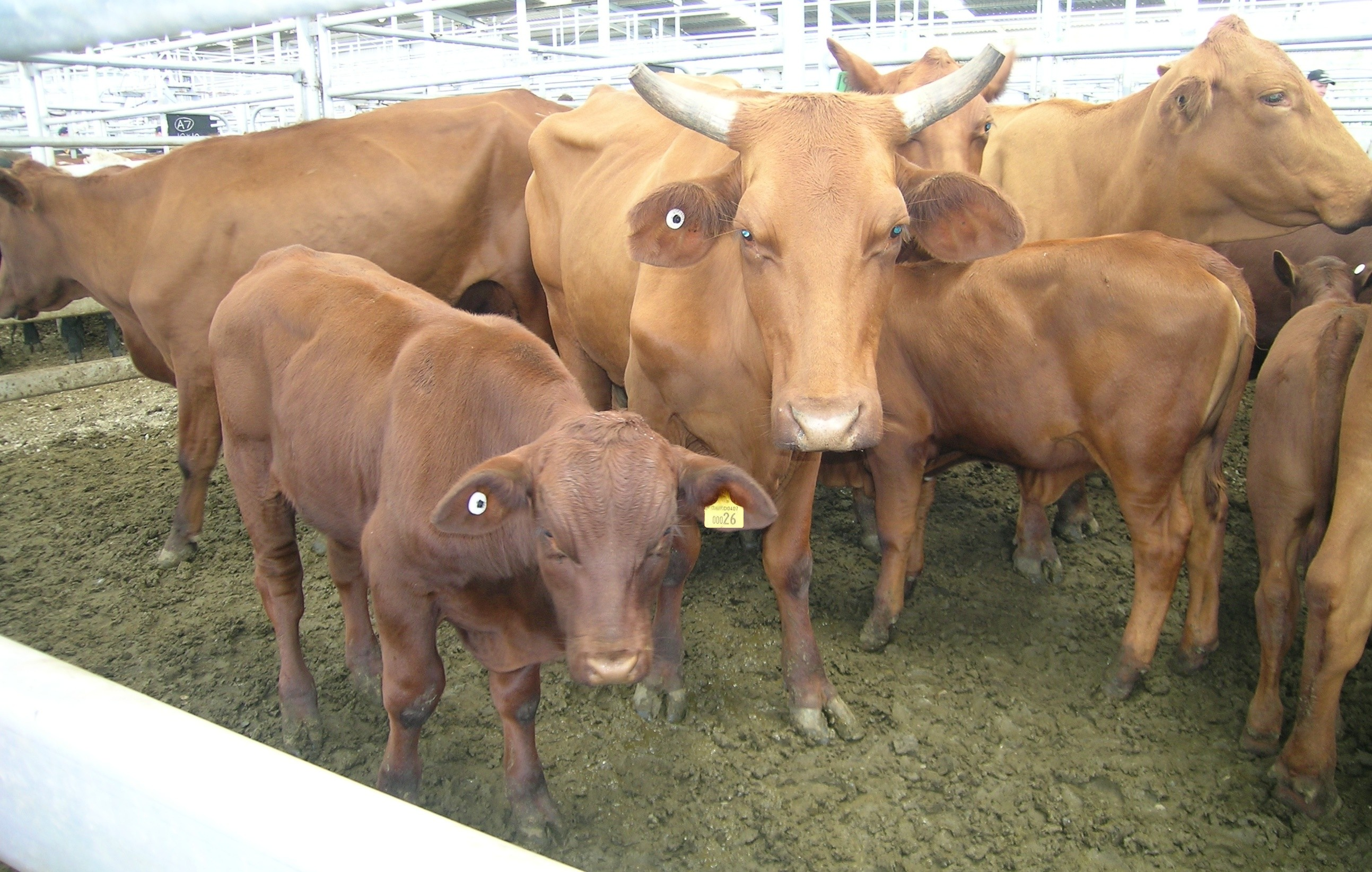
Santa Gertudis cattle with electronic and non-electronic ear tags

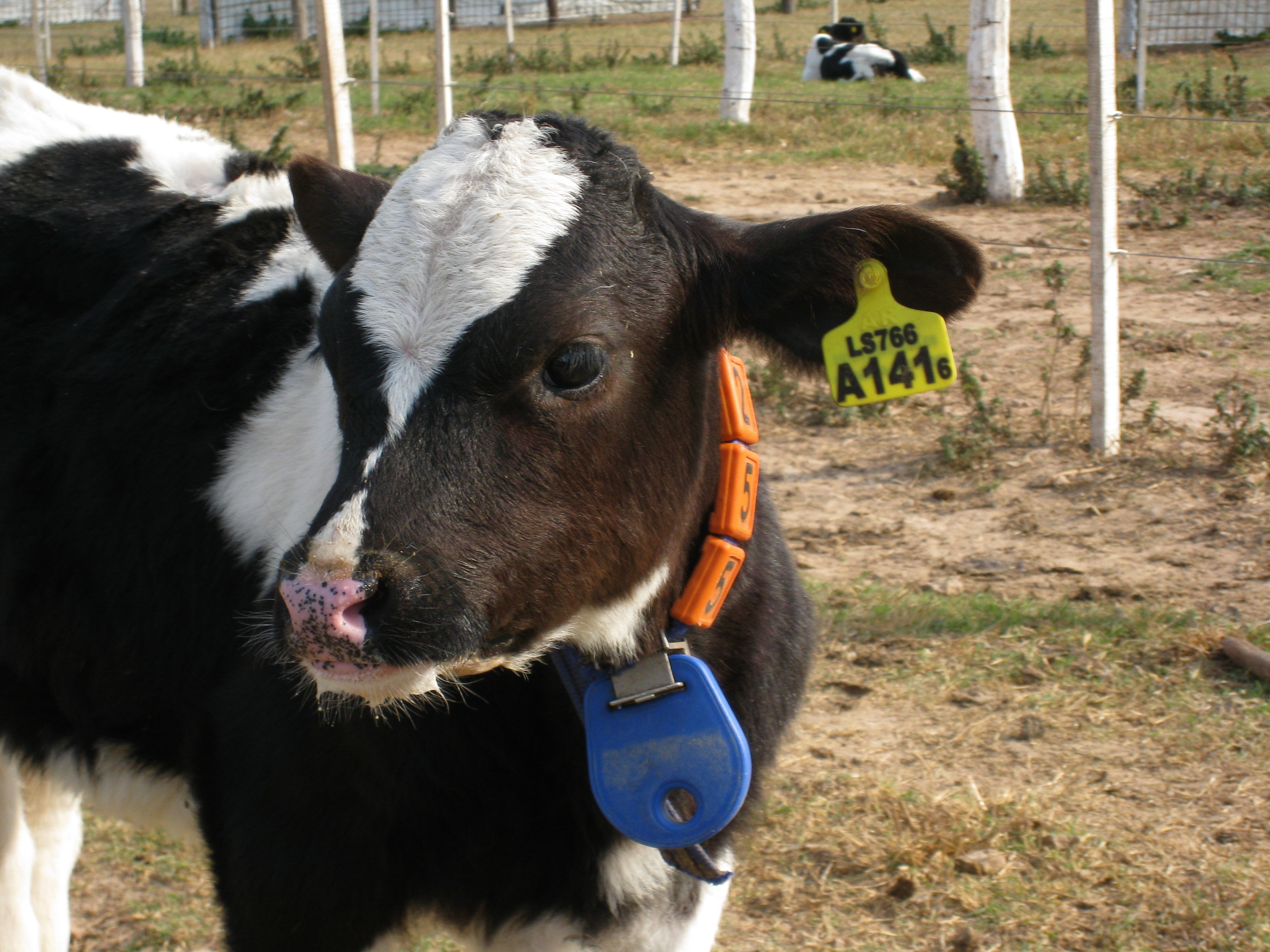
Calf with a non-electronic ear tag, numbered collar and transponder (blue device)

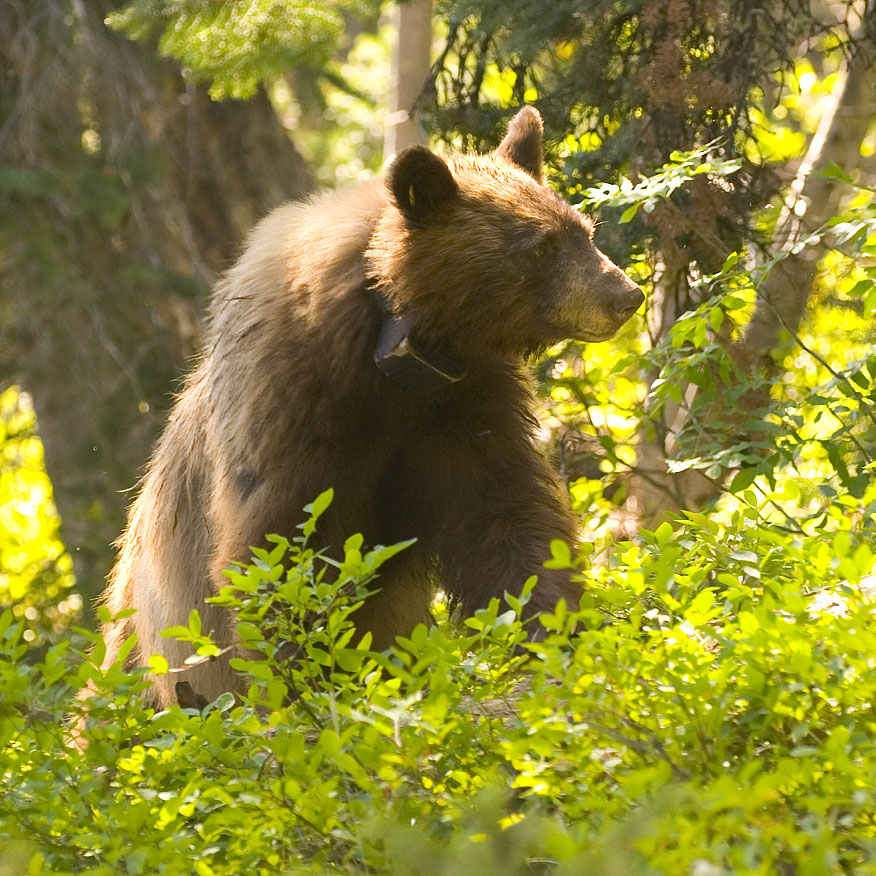
Bear with an ear tag and transponder

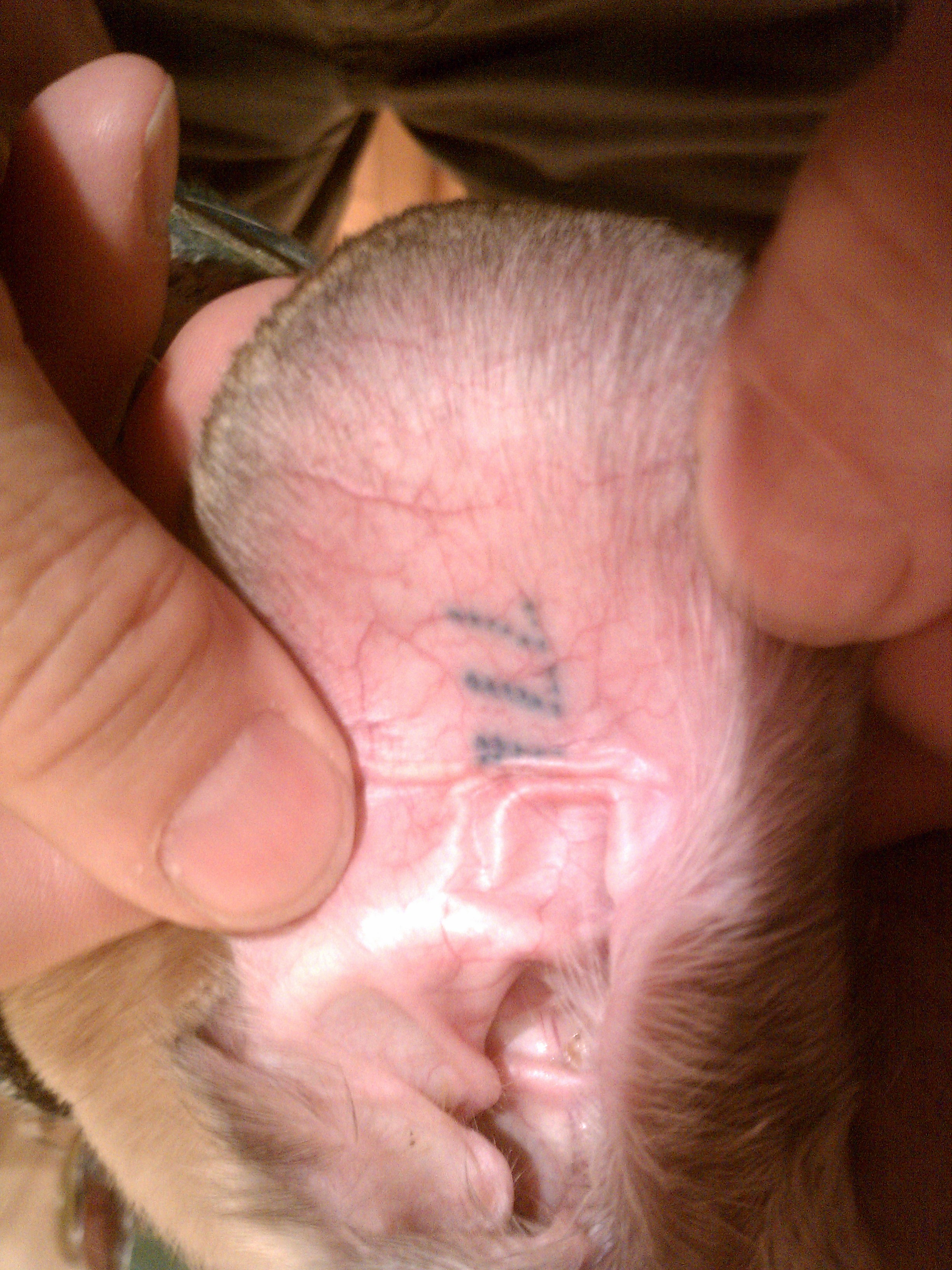
Tattoo inside a Greyhound's ear

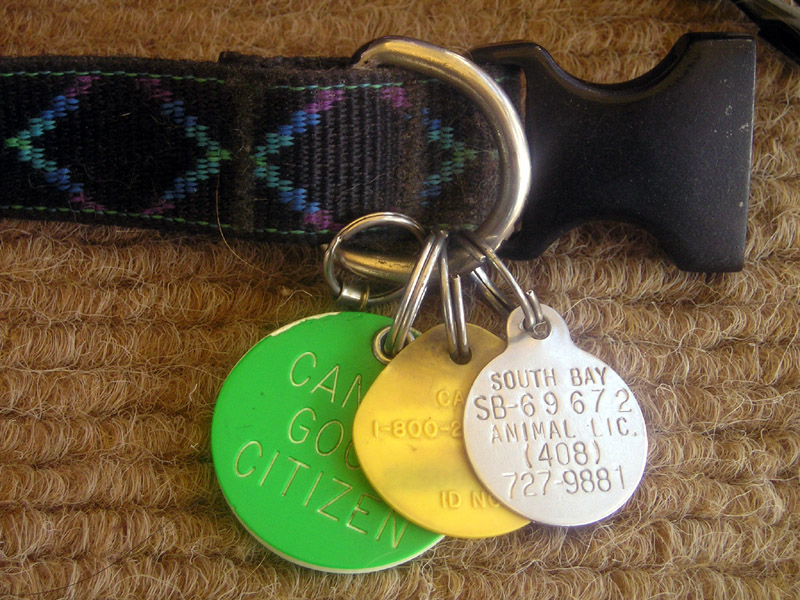
Dog collar with dog license and other dog tags

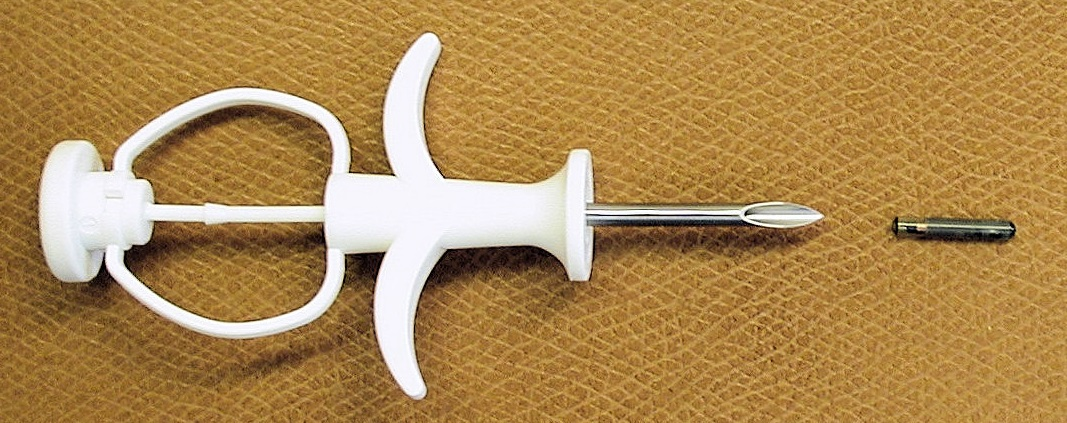
A microchip implant and applicator

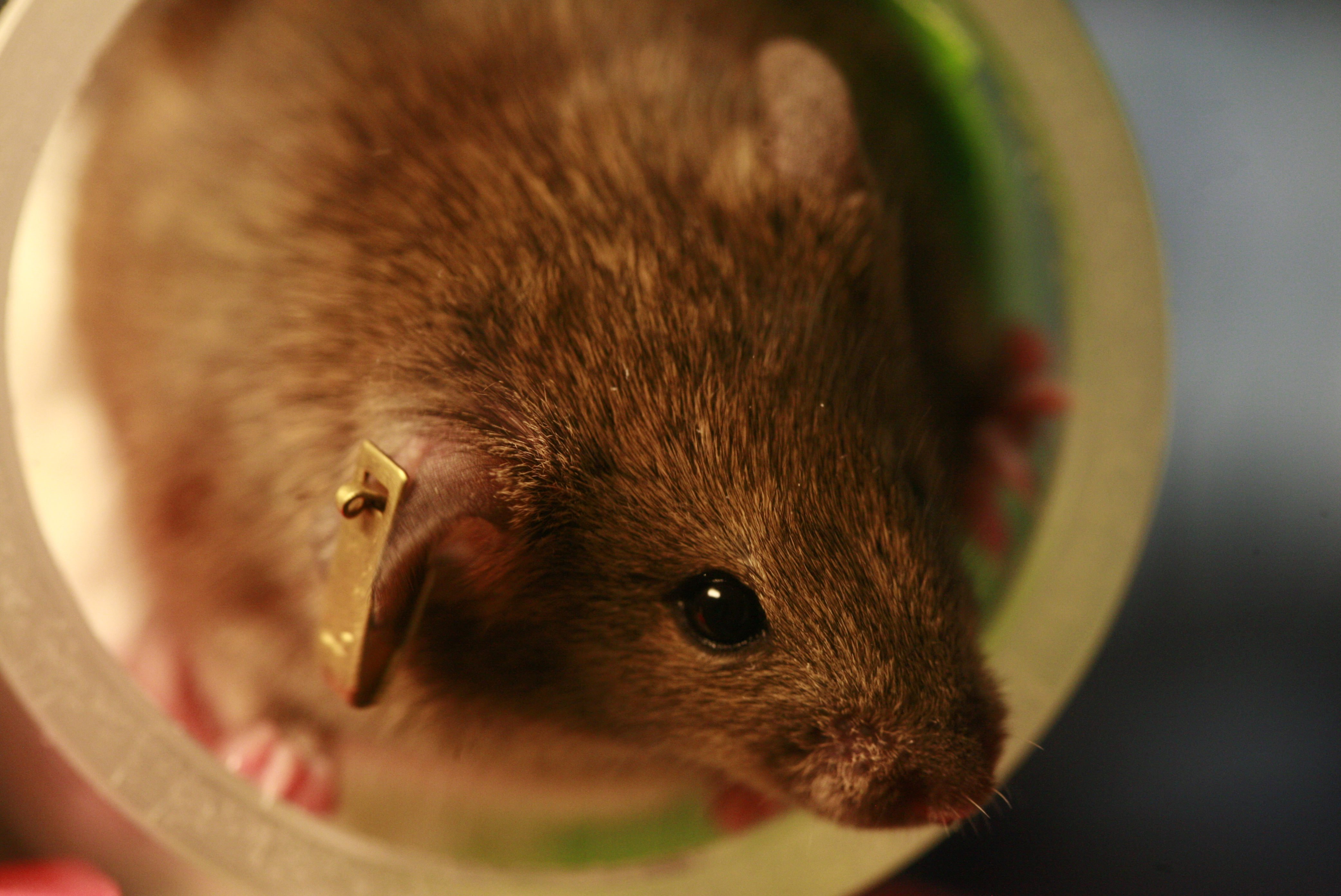
A laboratory mouse with an ear tag

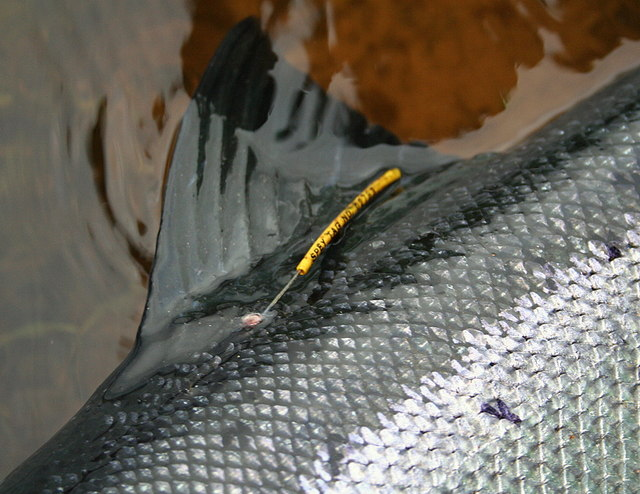
Fish with a transponder

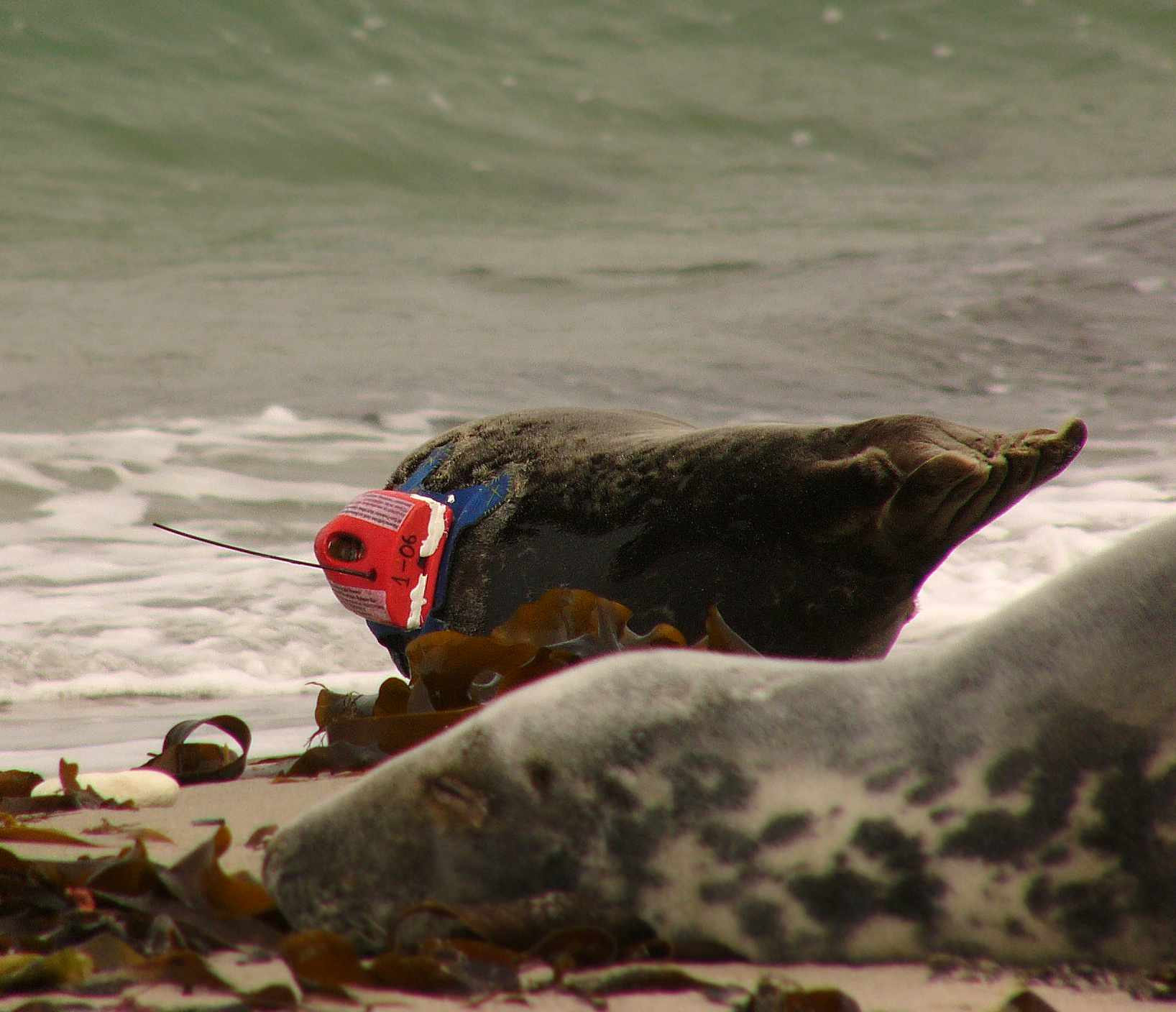
Harbour seal with a transponder

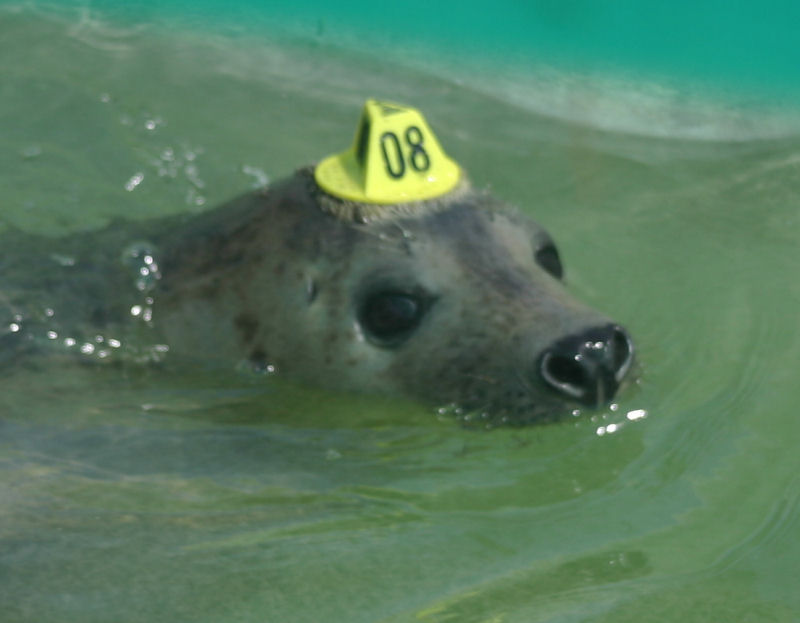
Common seal with an adhesive tag

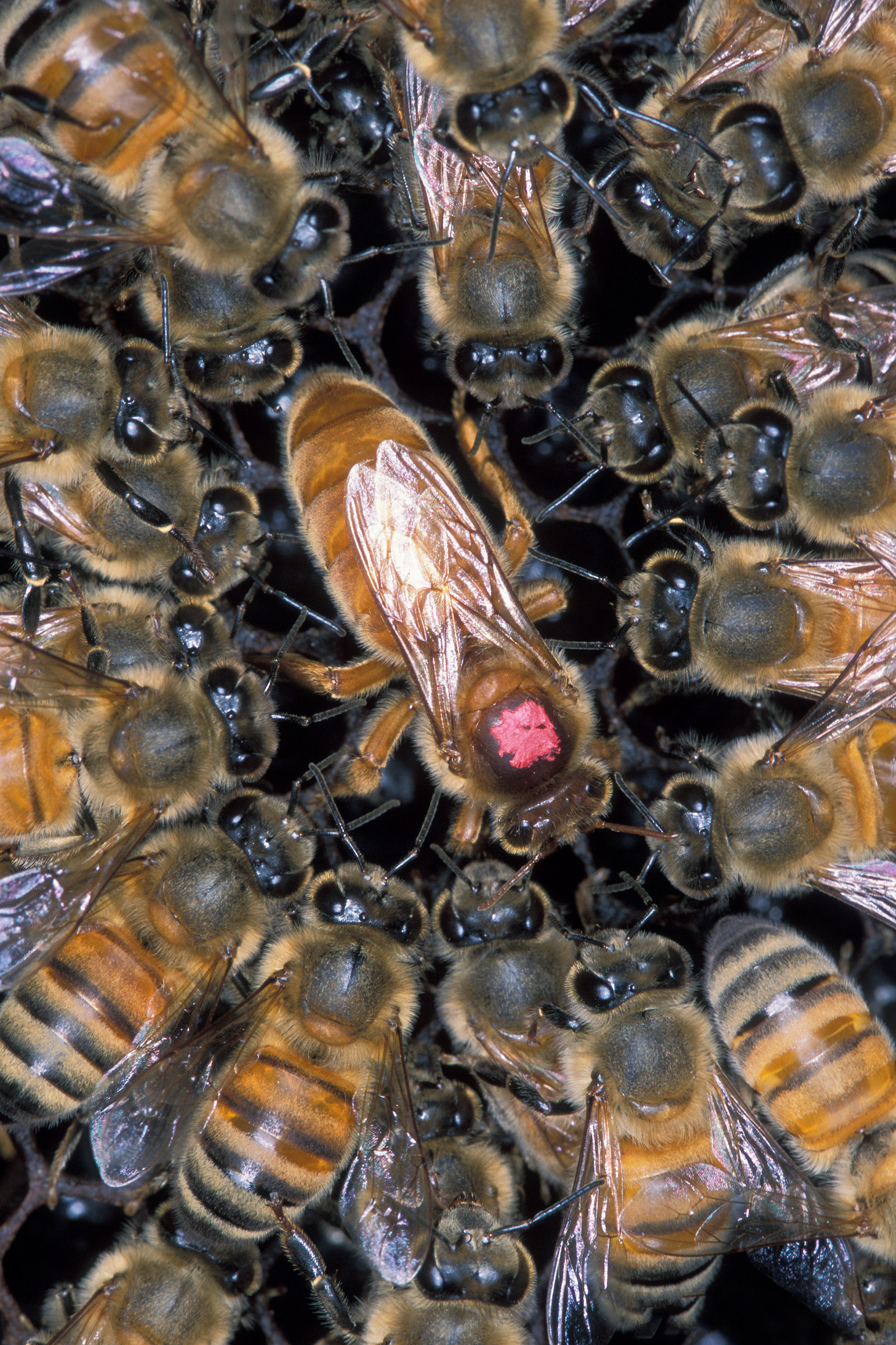
European queen honey bee marked with a paint spot surrounded by Africanised honeybees

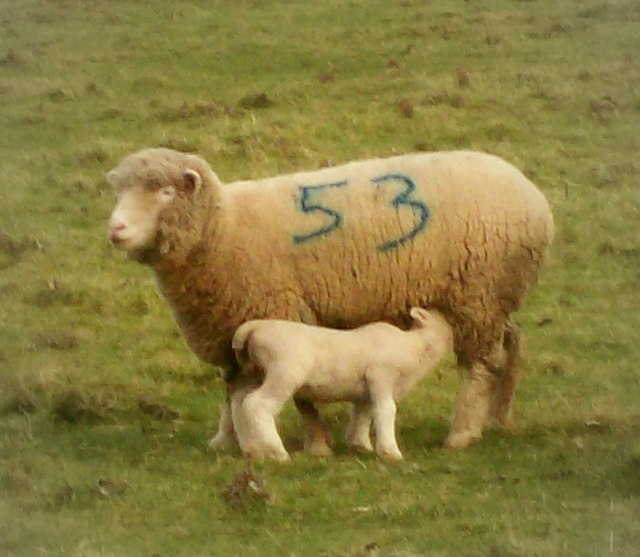
Sheep with painted number

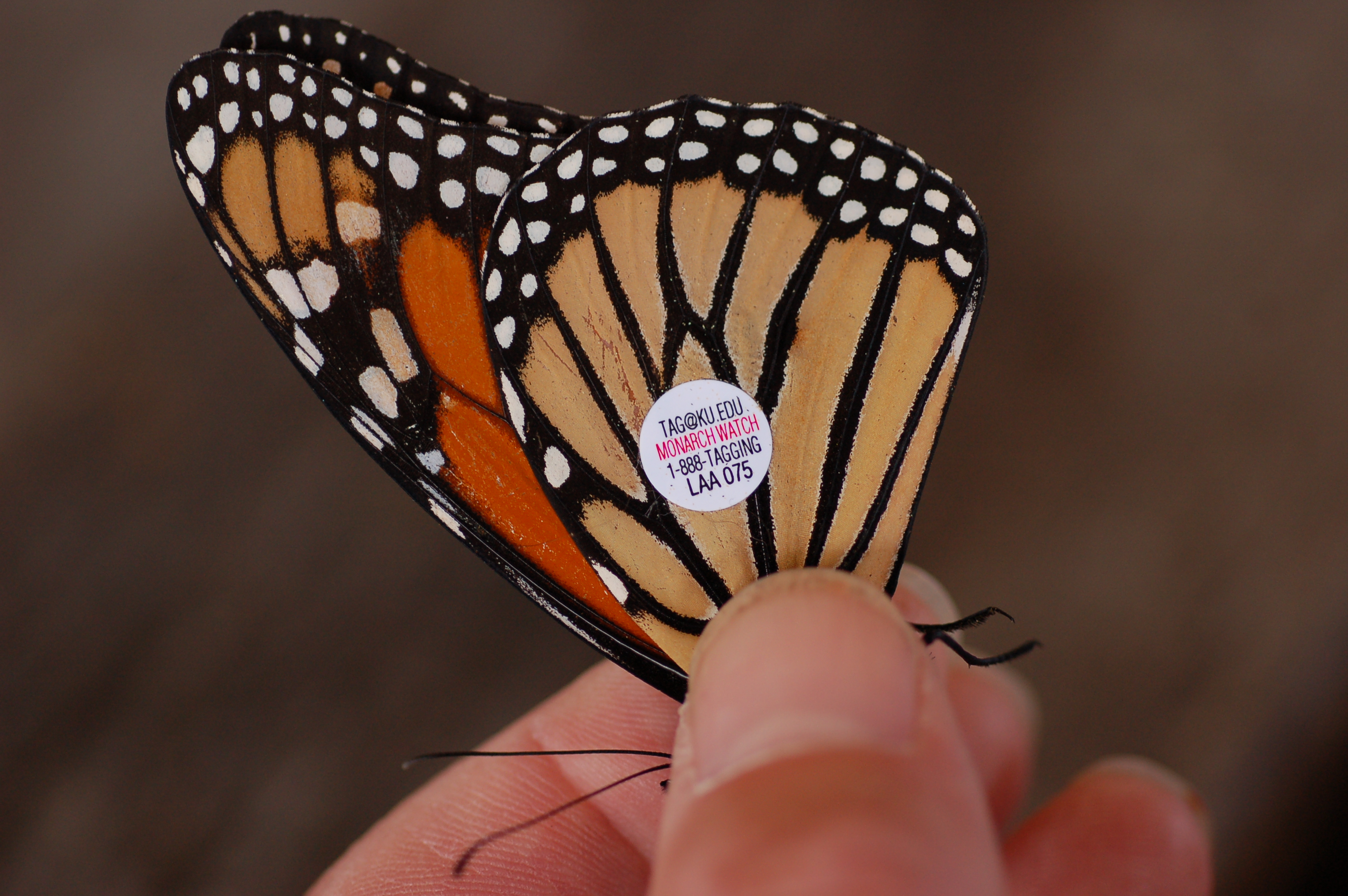
Monarch butterfly tagged with a sticker

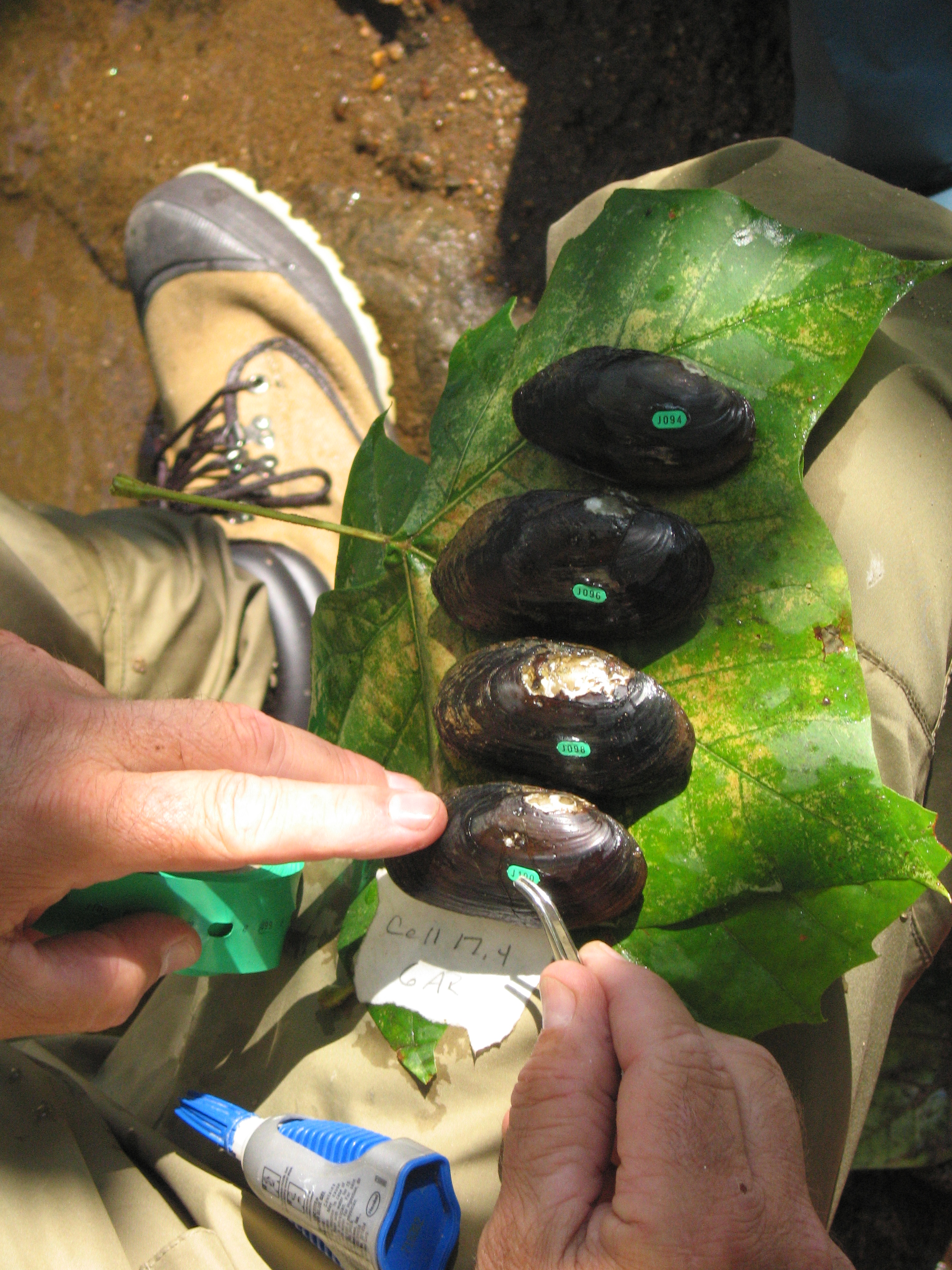
Mussels being tagged

RFID electronic identification ear tags for cattle
