= United States Animal Identification Plan =

United States Animal Identification Plan (USAIP) — Officials from approximately 70 animal industry organizations and government agencies have been working since early 2002 on a plan for a national system to identify that might follow food animals from birth to slaughter. The primary purpose is to trace animals back from slaughter through all premises within 48 hours of an animal disease outbreak, in order to determine the disease's origin and to contain it quickly. The plan calls for recording the movement of individual animals or groups of animals in a central database or in a seamlessly linked database infrastructure.

USDA's Animal and Plant Health Inspection Service (APHIS) is to coordinate animal ID activities in cooperation with state animal health authorities and producers for disease tracking purposes. Congressional interest in animal ID intensified after a cow with bovine spongiform encephalopathy (BSE) was discovered in the United States in December 2003. USDA in 2004 accelerated work on animal ID, and is incorporating major elements of the USAIP into what it has termed the National Animal Identification System (NAIS). Among the issues in establishing a national program are privacy of producer records, implementation cost and who should pay, and whether animal ID should be mandatory or voluntary.
