= Ear tag =

Object attached to a farmed or wild animal's ear for identification purposes

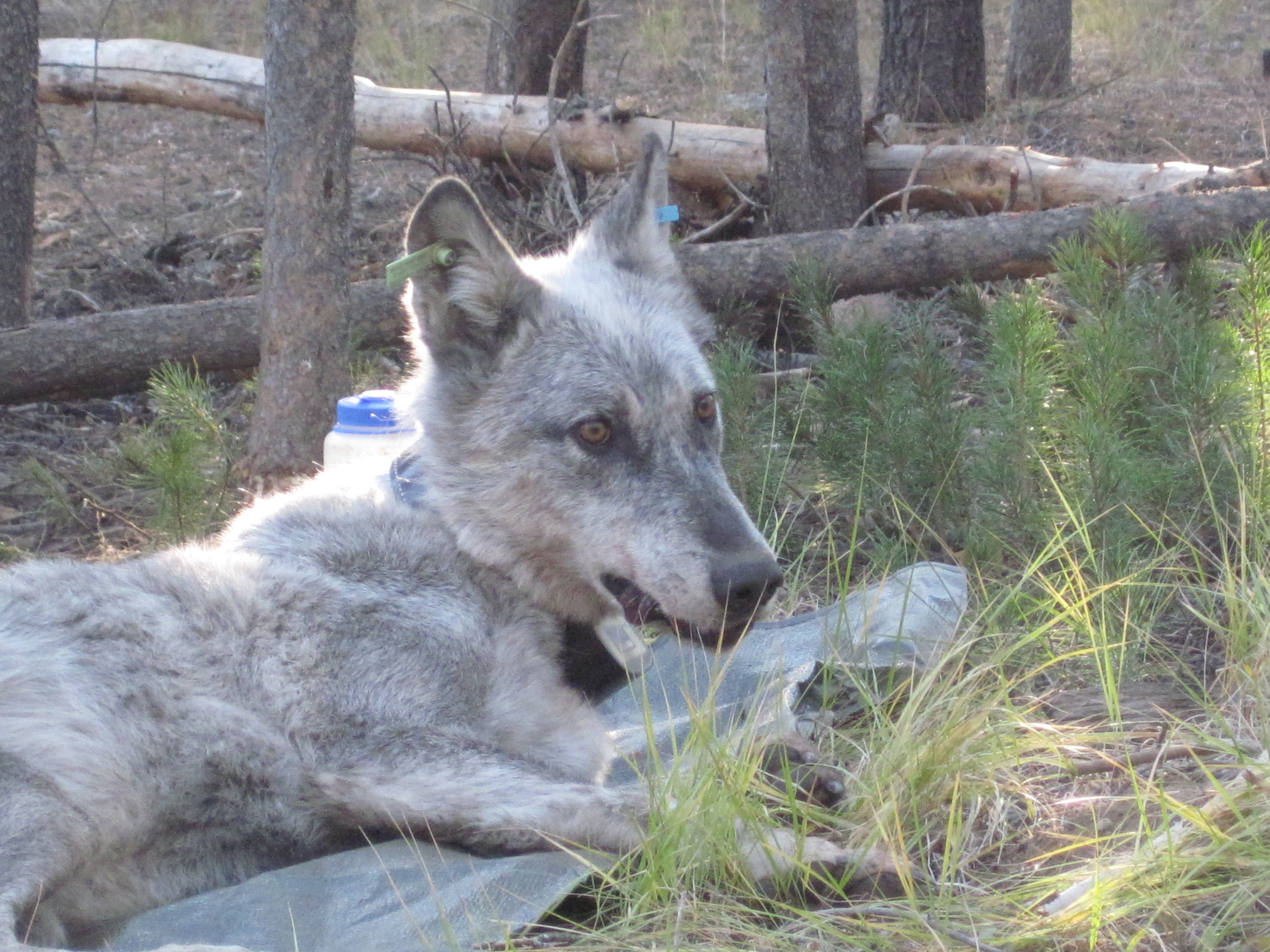
A wolf with a radio collar and ear tags.

An ear tag is a plastic or metal object used for identification of livestock and wildlife. It is also used to identify free-ranging dogs that have been vaccinated for rabies. If the ear tag uses Radio Frequency Identification Device (RFID) technology it is referred to as an electronic ear tag. Electronic ear tags conform to international standards ISO 11784 and ISO 11785 working at 134.2 kHz, as well as ISO/IEC 18000-6C operating in the UHF spectrum. There are other non-standard systems such as Destron working at 125 kHz. Although there are many shapes of ear tags, the main types in current use are as follows:

- Flag-shaped ear tag: two discs joined through the ear, one or both bearing a wide, flat plastic surface on which identification details are written or printed in large, easily legible script.
- Button-shaped ear tag: two discs joined through the ear.
- Plastic clip ear tag: a moulded plastic strip, folded over the edge of the ear and joined through it.
- Metal ear tag: an aluminium, steel or brass rectangle with sharp points, clipped over the edge of the ear, with the identification stamped into it.
- Electronic Identification Tags, include the EID number and sometimes a management number on the button that appears on the back of the ear. These can at times be combined as a matched set, which includes Visual tags with Electronic Identification Tags.

Each of these except the metal type may carry a RFID chip, which normally carries an electronic version of the same identification number.

== Overview ==
An ear tag usually carries an Animal Identification Number (AIN) or code for the animal, or for its herd, flock, or pack. Non electronic ear tags may be simply handwritten for the convenience of the farmer (these are known as "management tags"). Alternatively this identification number (ID) may be assigned by an organisation which is a not-for-profit organisation owned by cattle, sheep, goat and pig producers and funded by a levy on livestock sales with government input; an example is the Meat and Livestock Association (MLA) of Australia. Electronic tags may also show other information about the animal, including other related identification numbers; such as the Property Identification Code (PIC) for the properties the animals have been located. Depending on jurisdiction, the movement of certain species of livestock (primarily cattle, goats, sheep and pigs) must be recorded in the online database within 24 hours of the movement; and include the PICs of the properties the animals are travelling between.

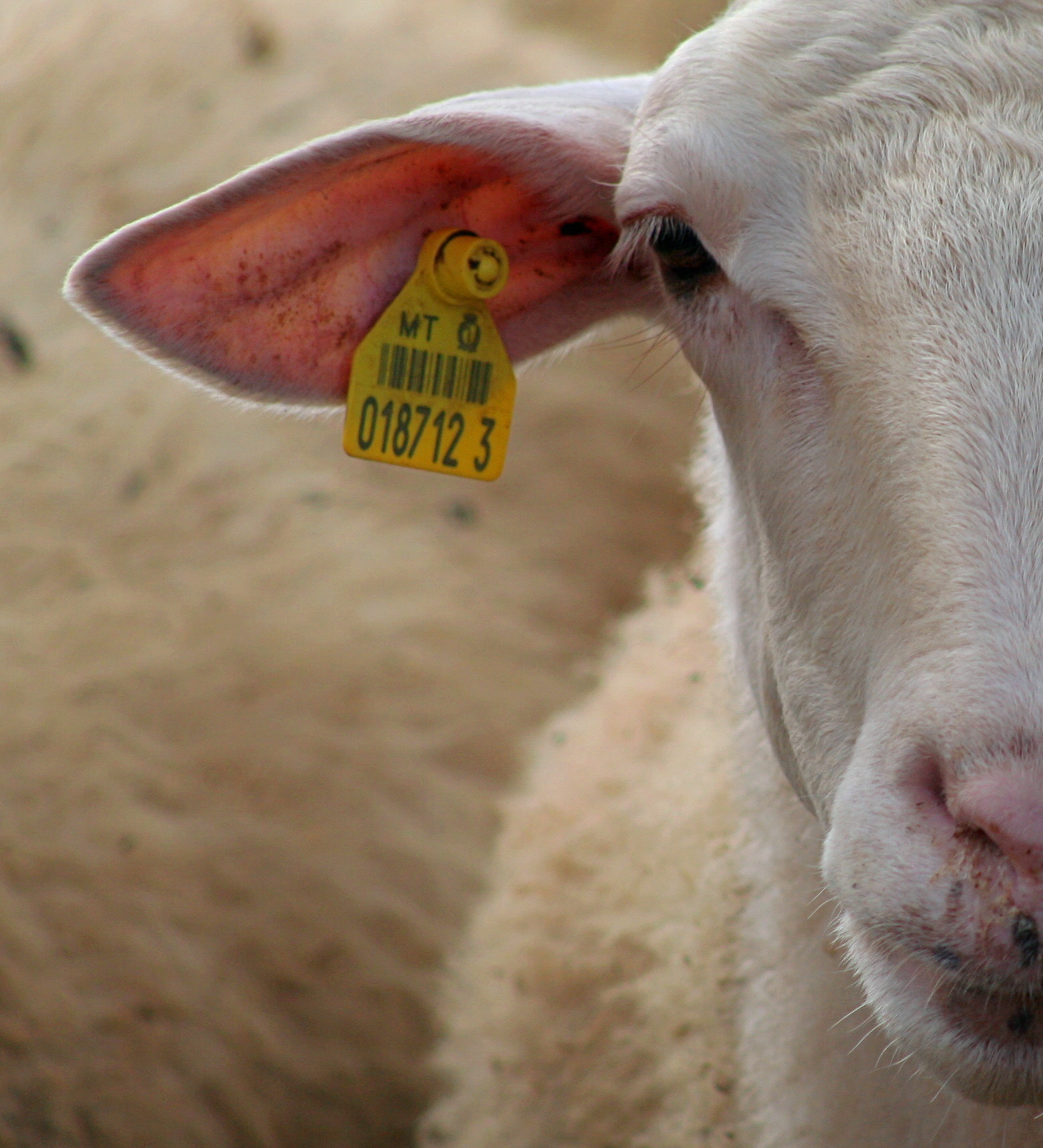
A sheep with an ear tag.

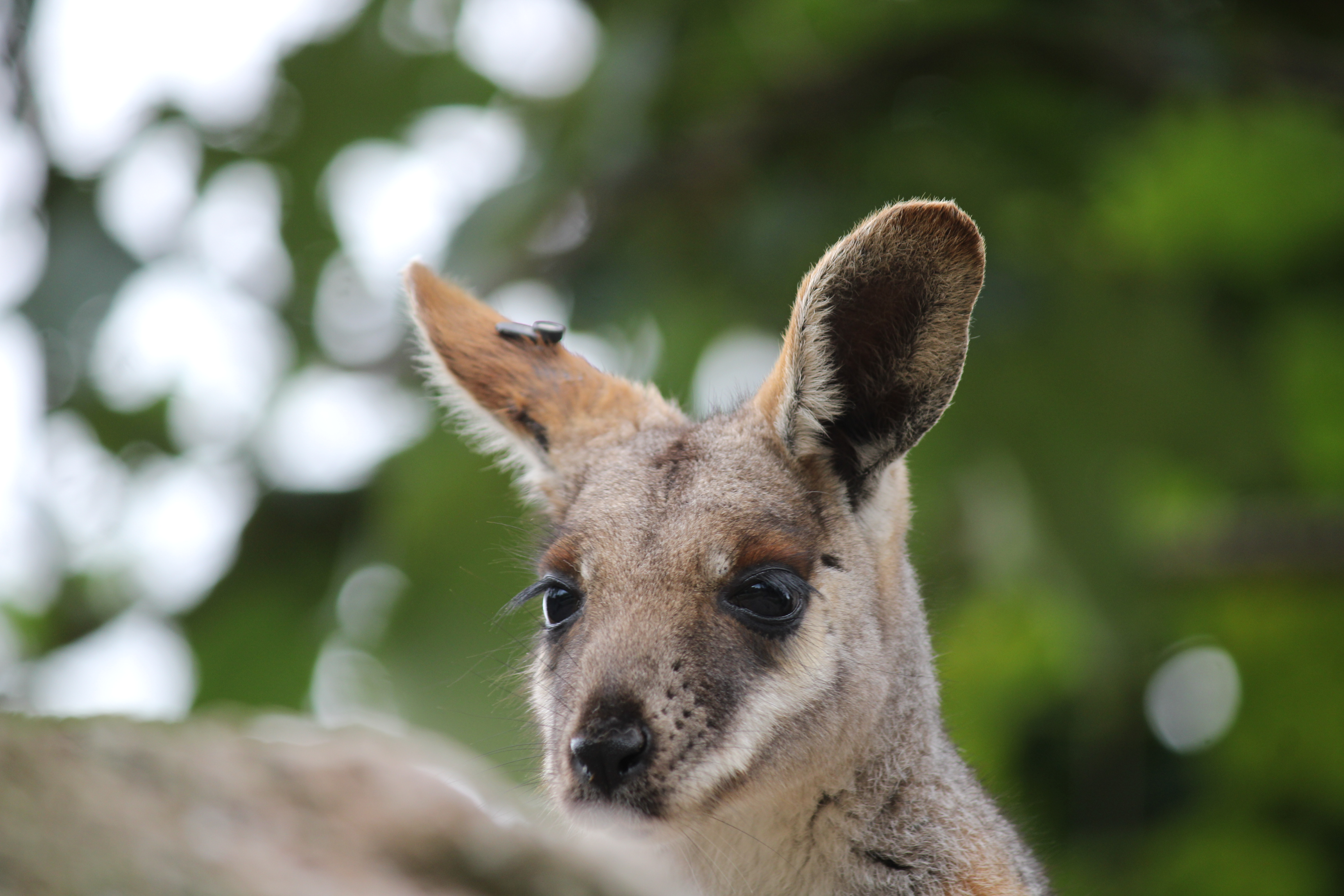
Tagged yellow-footed rock-wallaby at Copenhagen Zoo

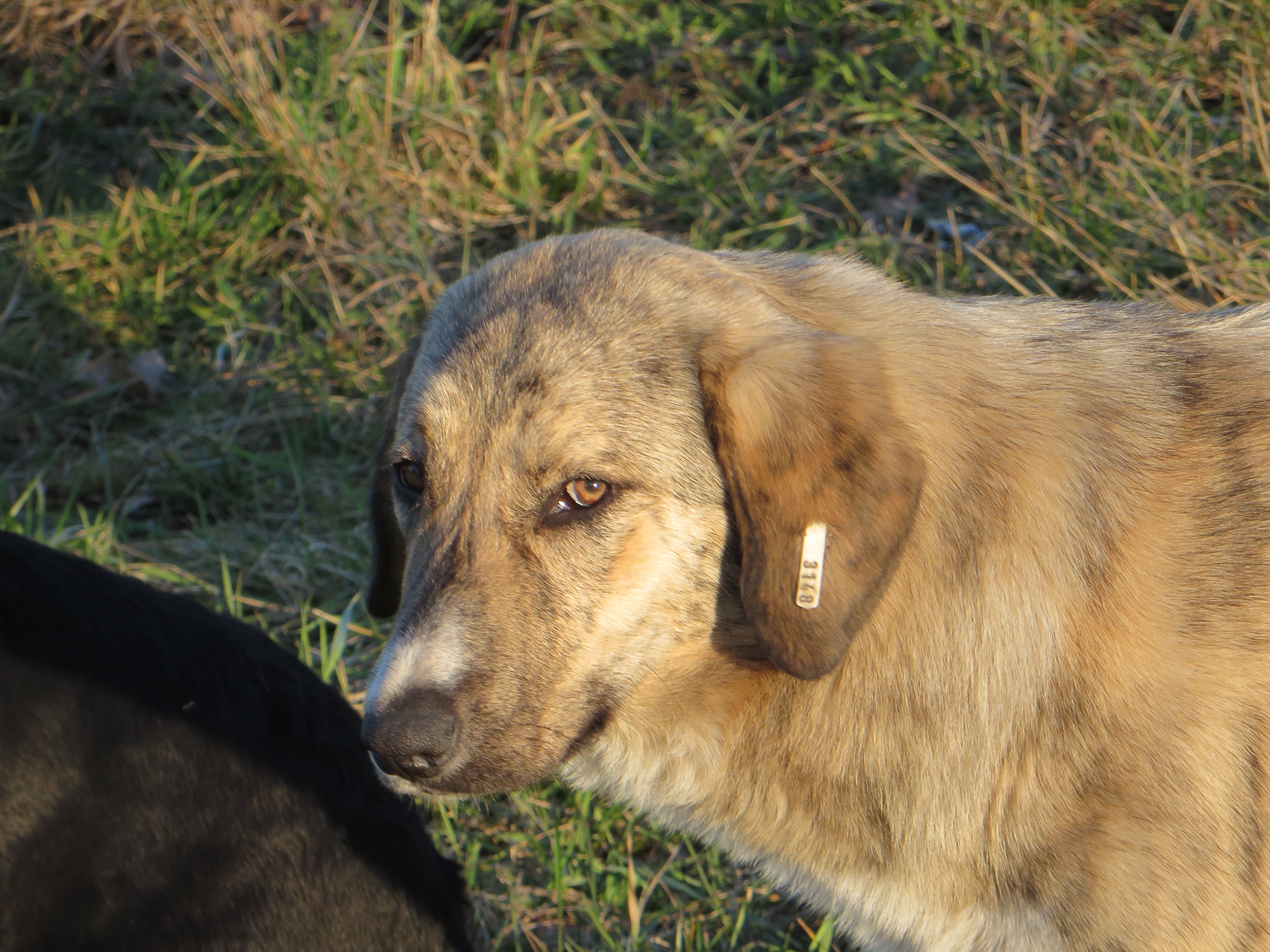
Tagged dog in Sarajevo

The National Livestock Identification System (NLIS) of Australia regulations require that all cattle be fitted with a RFID device in the form of an ear tag or rumen bolus (a cylindrical object placed in the rumen) before movement from the property and that the movement be reported to the NLIS. However, if animals are tagged for internal purposes in a herd or farm, IDs need not be unique in larger scales. The NLIS now also requires sheep and goats to use an ear tag that has the Property Identification Code inscribed on it. These ear tags and boluses are complemented by transport documents supplied by vendors that are used for identification and tracking.

A similar system is used for cattle in the European Union (EU), each bovine animal having a passport document and tag in each ear carrying the same number. Sheep and goats in the EU have tags in both ears, the carrying the official number of their flock and also for breeding stock an individual number for each animal; in case of sheep or goats intended for intra-community trade, one of these tags (the left one) must have a RFID chip (or the chip may instead be carried in a rumen bolus or on an anklet). Pigs are required in the EU to carry in one of the ears a tag with the number of the herd of birth, as well as with the numbers of any other herds the pig was kept with for more than 30 days; tattooing may be used as a replacement.

An ear tag can be applied with an ear tag applicator, however there are also specially designed tags that can be applied by hand. Depending on the purpose of the tagging, an animal may be tagged on one ear or both. There may be requirements for the placement of ear tags, and care must be taken to ensure they are not placed too close to the edge of the ear pinnae; which may leave the tag vulnerable to being ripped out accidentally. If there exists a national animal identification programme in a country, animals may be tagged on both ears for the sake of increased security and effectiveness, or as a legal requirement. If animals are tagged for private purposes, usually one ear is tagged. Australian sheep and goats are required to have visually readable ear tags printed with a Property Identification Code (PIC). They are complemented by movement documents supplied by consignors that are used for identification and tracking.

Very small ear tags are available for laboratory animals such as mice and rats. They are usually sold with a device that pierces the animal's ear and installs the tag at the same time. Lab animals can also be identified by other methods such as ear punching or marking (also used for livestock; see below), implanted RFID tags (mice are too small to wear an ear tag containing an RFID chip), and dye.

== History ==
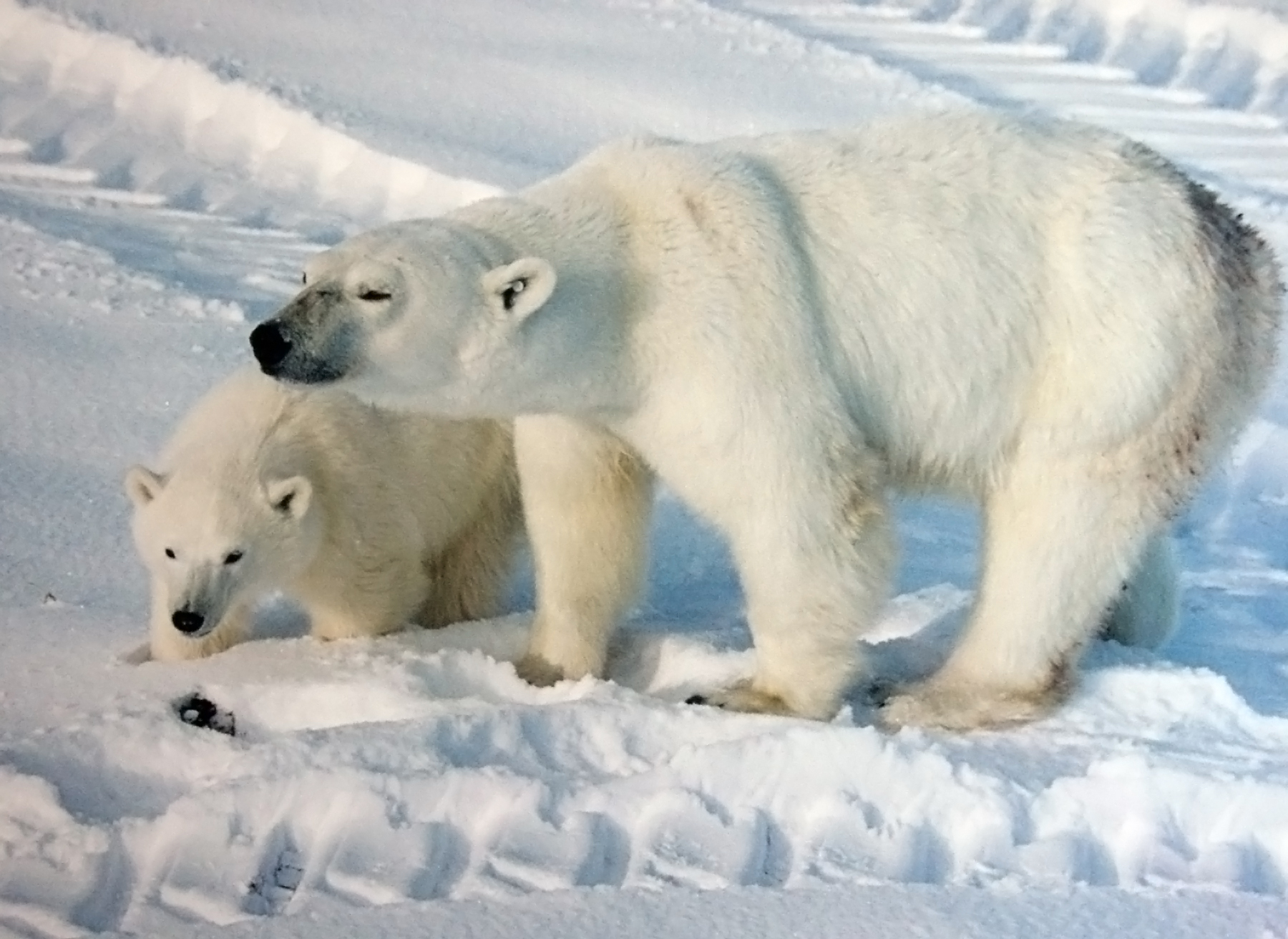
A sow polar bear with ear tag

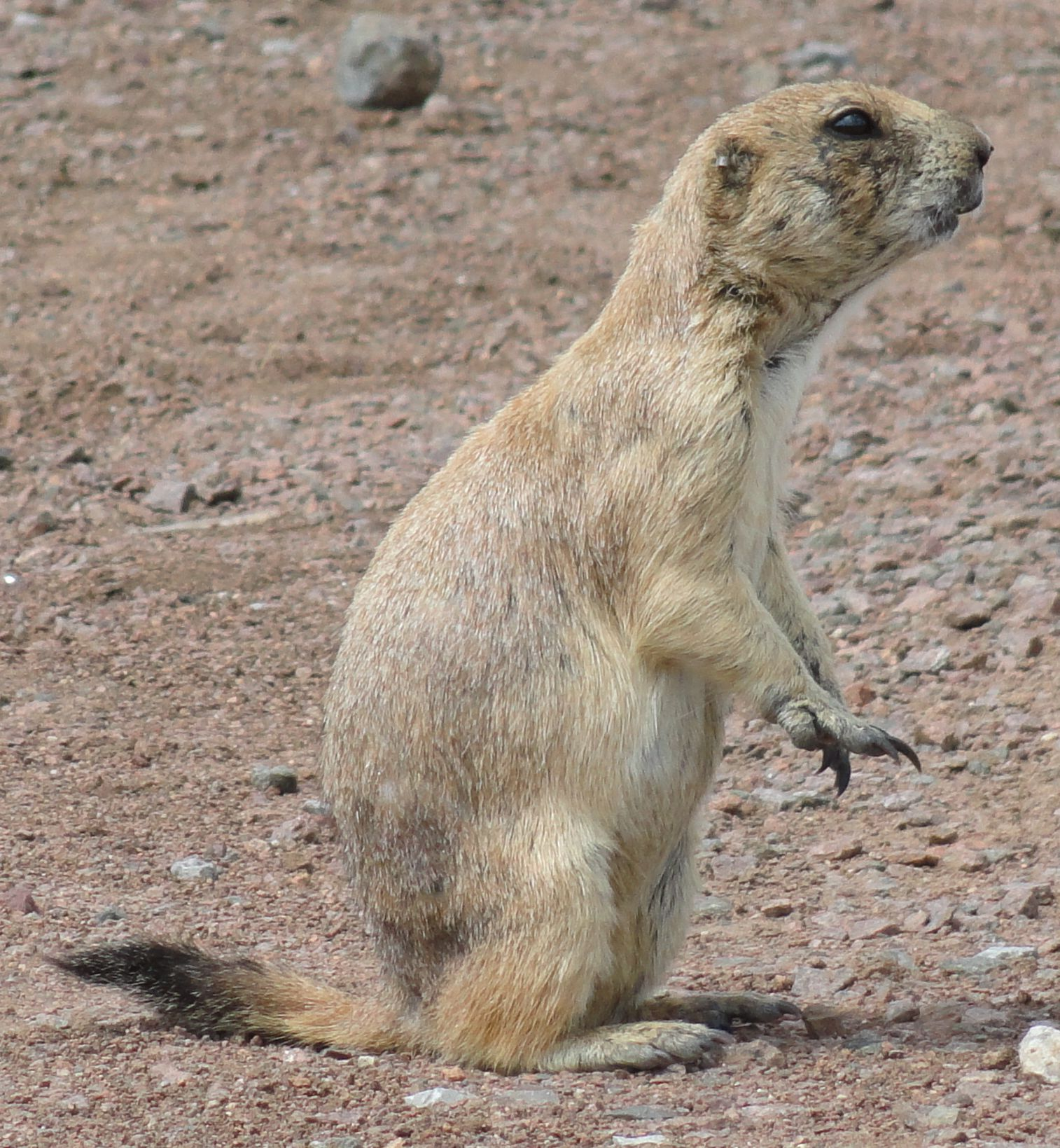
A tagged black-tailed prairie dog

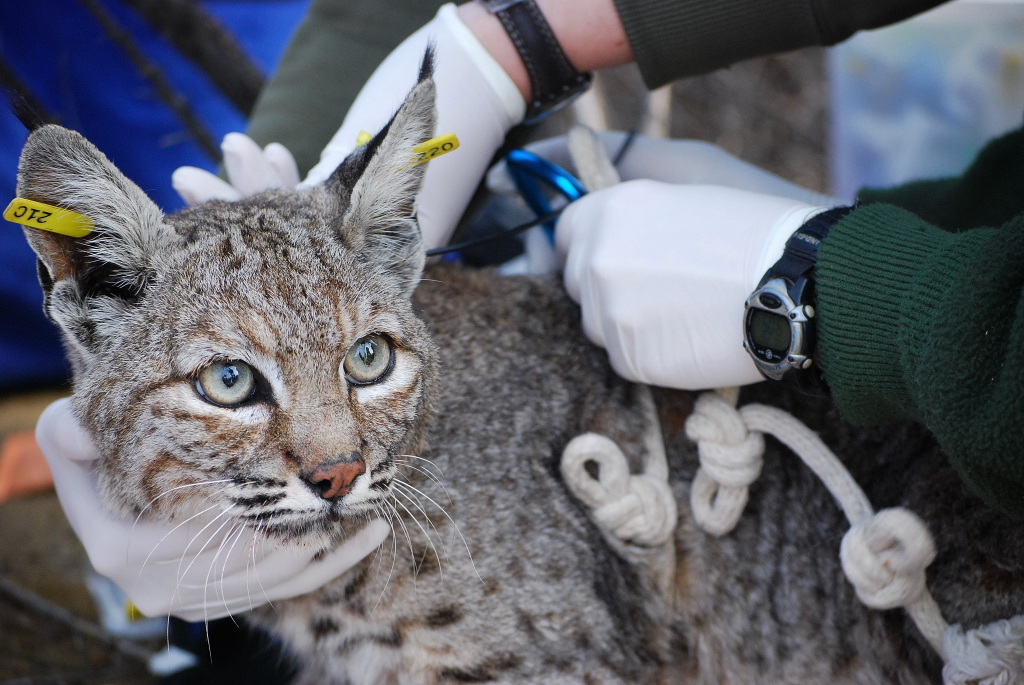
A bobcat with ear tags

Livestock ear tags were developed in 1799 under the direction of Sir Joseph Banks, President of the Royal Society, for identification of Merino sheep in the flock established for King George III. Matthew Boulton designed and produced the first batch of sheep eartags, and produced subsequent batches, modified according to suggestions received from Banks. The first tags were made of tin.

Ear tags were incorporated as breed identification in the United States with the forming of the International Ohio Improved Chester Association as early as 1895, and stipulated in the Articles of Incorporation, as an association animal and breed identification, of the improved Chester White.

Although ear tags were developed in Canada as early as 1913 as a means to identify cattle when testing for tuberculosis, the significant increase of use of ear tags appeared with the outbreak of BSE in UK. Today, ear tags in a variety of designs are used throughout the world on many species of animal to ensure traceability, to help prevent theft and to control disease outbreaks.

The first ear tags were primarily steel with nickel plating. After World War II, larger, flag-like, plastic tags were developed in the United States. Designed to be visible from a distance, these were applied by cutting a slit in the ear and slipping the arrow-shaped head of the tag through it so that the flag would hang from the ear.

In 1953, the first two-piece, self-piercing plastic ear tag was developed and patented. This tag, which combined the easy application of metal tags with the visibility and colour options of plastic tags, also limited the transfer of blood-borne diseases between animals during the application process.

Some cattle ear tags contain chemicals to repel insects, such as buffalo flies, horseflies, etc. Metal ear tags are used to identify the date of regulation shearing of stud and show sheep. Today, a large number of manufacturers are in competition for the identification of world livestock population.

In 2004, the U.S. Government asked farmers to use EID or Electronic Identification ear tags on all their cattle. This request was part of the National Animal Identification System (NAIS) spurred by the discovery of the first case of mad cow disease in the United States. Due to poor performance and concern that other people could access their confidential information, only about 30 percent of cattle producers in the United States tried using EID tags using standards based on the low frequency standards, while the UHF standards are being mandated for use in Brazil, Paraguay, and Korea. The United States Department of Agriculture maintains a list of manufacturers approved to sell ear tags in the USA.

Ear tags (conventional and electronic) are used in the EU as official ID system for cattle, sheep and goat, in some cases combined with RFID devices

The International Committee for Animal Recording (ICAR) controls the issue electronic tag numbers under ISO regulation 11784.

The National Livestock Identification System (NLIS) is Australia's system for tracing cattle, sheep and goats from birth to slaughter.

Electronic cattle ear tags used in Canada

In Canada, the Health of Animals Regulations require approved ear tags on all bison, cattle and sheep that leave the farm of origin, except that a bovine may be moved, without a tag, from the farm of origin to a tagging site. RFID (radio frequency identification) tags are used for cattle in Canada and metal as well as RFID tags have been in use for sheep. Mandatory RFID tagging of sheep in Canada (which was previously scheduled to take effect January 1, 2013) will be deferred to some later date.

== Other forms of animal identification ==
Pigs, cattle and sheep are frequently earmarked with pliers that notch registered owner and/or age marks into the ear. Mares on large horse breeding farms have a plastic tag attached to a neck strap for identification; which preserves their ears free of notches. Dairy cows are sometimes identified with ratchet fastened plastic anklets fitted on the pastern for ready inspection during milking; however, NLIS requirements apply to cattle – including both dairy and beef animals. More commonly coloured electrical tape is used as short-term ankle identifiers for dairy animals to identify when one teat should not be milked for any reason. Laboratory rodents are often marked with ear tags, ear notches or implantable microchips.

The National Livestock Identification System (NLIS) Australia, formerly used cattle tail tags for property identification and hormone usage declaration.

== See also ==
- Branding iron
- British Cattle Movement Service
- Cattle crush
- Livestock branding
- Animal Identification
