= National Animal Identification and Tracing =

National Animal Identification and Tracing (NAIT) is a system of agricultural animal tracing in New Zealand for biosecurity and human health. The schemes use radio-frequency identification (RFID) technology and a national database to trace animals from birth to either slaughter or live export.

== History ==
NAIT was introduced by the National Animal Identification and Tracing Act 2012 which replaced the Animal Identification Act 1993. NAIT can refer to the Act, the company of the same name created under the Act, the schemes for cattle and deer or identification devices and identifiers issued under the schemes.

On 1 July 2013 the NAIT company merged with Animal Health Board to become OSPRI New Zealand.

The investigation into the 2017 Mycoplasma bovis outbreak indicated that farmers were not being fully compliant, e.g. with the "cash sale" of bobby calves, although there has only been one conviction under the act (resulting in a $150 fine).

A 2018 law change "under urgency" gave the ministry extra powers to enforce the act.

== Opposition ==
Federated Farmers, a farmers membership organisation, initially opposed the NAIT system saying that it would impose extra costs on farmers and will not result in any benefits. Farmers also feared that the NAIT scheme would be used to impose a greenhouse gas emissions tax under an emissions trading scheme. A Federated Farmers survey found that 2% supported NAIT and 80% opposed it. A NAIT working group claimed that there would be on-farm benefits.

In November 2019, Federated Farmers meat and wool chairman Miles Anderson welcomed amendments to the NAIT legislation and thanked the Primary Production Select Committee for listening to representations from Federated Farmers and other parties. In mid–May 2021, the group welcomed the 2021 New Zealand budget's allocation of $22 million in funding to the NAIT scheme, which aims to help authorities respond to issues such as mycoplasma bovis.

== See also ==
- Animal identification
