= British Cattle Movement Service =

Organization maintaining a database of all bovines in Great Britain

The logo of the British Cattle Movement Service

The British Cattle Movement Service (BCMS) is the organisation responsible for maintaining a database of all bovine animals in Great Britain; Northern Ireland has a separate database maintained by the Department of Agriculture, Environment and Rural Affairs. It was established in the wake of the mad cow disease crisis in the UK, and is part of the Rural Payments Agency. Member states of the European Union have similar cattle tracing systems.

Every bovine animal in the United Kingdom has a unique number, shown both on an ear tag in each ear and on a paper cattle passport which is held by the current keeper of the animal. The system covers cattle and also other bovine animals such as water buffalo, yak, bison and hybrids. The number and passport remain with the animal throughout its life, and are recorded by the slaughterhouse at its death, allowing traceability of the beef. The BCMS central database is called the Cattle Tracing System, and works alongside the physical passport to record the births, deaths and movements of all cattle.

== Cattle Tracing System ==
The Cattle Tracing System (CTS) is the database for all cattle in Great Britain (Northern Ireland has a separate tracing system), to which farmers must notify births, movements and deaths of cattle on their holding. The system was introduced on 28 September 1998 in order to meet EU legislation requiring all member states to have a computerised tracing system by the end of 1999. There are currently four ways to notify CTS about births/movements/deaths including via the postal service using movement cards (cheque-book style passports only) and passport applications, over the telephone using the CTS Self-Service Line, over the internet using the CTS Online service or through third party software using CTS Web Services.

== Cattle passport ==
A4 British Cattle Passport as issued from 2011

The cattle passport has taken three forms.

- From its introduction on 1 July 1996 the passport was a single green A4 paper sheet. This showed details of the animal including its birth holding, ear tag number, breed, date of birth, sex and its mother's ear tag number. Also included were a number of sections to be filled in when the animal moved to other holdings, showing the movement date and the new holding number (holdings include other farms, agricultural shows and abattoirs). At the time of its introduction there was no requirement for such movements to be registered centrally. When this requirement was introduced on 28 September 1998, a further A4 document was issued for all existing cattle, to be used in conjunction with the green A4 passport. This was the Certificate of CTS Registration, and it included pre-paid postage tear-off movement cards to be sent to BCMS to register each movement. Movements could be registered using these cards, or electronically by using the new online CTS. Because of the limited lifespan of cattle, few green A4 passports remain in use.
- From 28 September 1998 to 2011 the passport was issued as a booklet, made in a similar style to a cheque book. This included the same information as before, but with spaces for bar-coded stickers for holding numbers, and many pages to allow for numerous movements. The prepaid cards were incorporated in the booklet as tear-out pages, so animals with this format of passport did not also need a Certificate of CTS Registration.

Chequebook-style cattle passport as issued from 1998 to 2011. (Note: this example passport's number is unrealistic, because it would be for the 89,012th calf born into the herd.)

- From 1 August 2011 the format returned to a single A4 page. The tear-out cards were omitted, requiring all movements relating to that animal to be reported electronically or by telephone. Spaces are provided on the reverse for details of up to six movements, and for further movements continuation sheets are attached.

Each format change only affected new issues of passports, leaving the old passports in circulation and retaining former reporting methods for them. Replacement passports (for example in the case of loss or amendment) are in the format which is current at the time of re-issue.

When an animal dies, the date of death is entered in the passport and this is returned to BCMS. The death may be notified electronically in addition.

If the rules for animal registration (and thus animal traceability) are not followed correctly, a passport will not be issued (this is most commonly where the deadline for calf registration is missed, of 28 days from birth). Instead the animal will receive an A4 Notice of Registration document (similar to the Certificate of CTS Registration), and its details will be held on the CTS. Such an animal may be used for breeding, but it may not enter the human food chain and it may not normally move between holdings except to slaughter.

== Ear tag number ==
Every bovine animal in the UK must have an ear tag in each ear: a primary tag in one ear, which must be a large yellow plastic tag, and a secondary tag in the other, which may be similar to the primary, or it may be a smaller plastic tag (usually but not always also yellow) or a metal clip. Each tag must have the cattle passport number printed or stamped upon it, and the secondary tag may also include a RFID chip bearing the same number in electronic form. Tags may also include the passport number as a barcode, and they may have a space for "management information" to be written by the farmer (for example a name).

The British ear tag and passport number is in the format UK HHHHHH CNNNNN – this has been in use since 2002, before which other formats were used. The current format breaks down as follows:

- UK – the country code (electronic readers read the UK country code as 826, in line with ISO 3166);
- H – a unique six-figure number given to each herd (usually one herd per farm, or sometimes one for each bovine enterprise on a farm);
- C – a check digit from one to seven. See below for calculation.
- N – a sequential five-figure number for each calf born into that herd (with leading zeros where necessary).

Numbering example: If a herd had the number 123450, its first three calves would have the numbers:

- UK 123450 600001
- UK 123450 700002
- UK 123450 100003

The check digit highlights a large majority of errors in reading or recording the sequential number. A single-figure error in either the herd number sequential number will not match the check digit, unless it happens to produce a figure differing by a multiple of seven. For example, a herd number of "123456" would have to be misread as "193456", or a sequential number of "00016" would have to be misread as "00086".

Similar numbering is used for sheep and goats, with the omission of the check digit (and there is no individual paper passport). The number assigned to a sheep and goat flock is usually (but not always) the same six-figure number as that assigned to a cattle herd on the same farm.

For tags in Northern Ireland, the letters “UK” followed by the unique lifetime identification number consisting of the digit “9” followed by the herd number (3 to 6 digits in length), the individual animal code (1 to 4 digits in length) and a check digit (1 digit in length), each number group separated from the previous group by a space.

== Check digit ==
The check digits for cattle ear tags are calculated by dividing the number obtained from the herd mark and animal number by 7 and adding one to the remainder. For example, if the UK herd mark is 303565 and the animal number is 01234, the check digit is calculated as follows:

- 30356501234 MOD 7 = 3
- Take answer above and add 1 so 3 + 1 = 4
- Check Sum is therefore 4
- Final ear tag is UK 303565 401234

The formula below will calculate the check digit in a spreadsheet, where UK herd number = x, animal number = y, and x and y represent cells in the spreadsheet.

Check digit = ((x*100000+y)-(7*(INT((x*100000+y)/7))))+1

In practice this process gives a check digit for the first animal in the herd, which then increases by one for each sequential animal number, cycling from one to seven.

== See also ==
- Animal identification
