= Liz McIntyre =

Liz McIntyre may refer to:

- Liz McIntyre (writer), consumer privacy expert and author
- Elizabeth McIntyre (born 1965), American skier
