= Tracking system =

Technological system for locating moving persons or objects

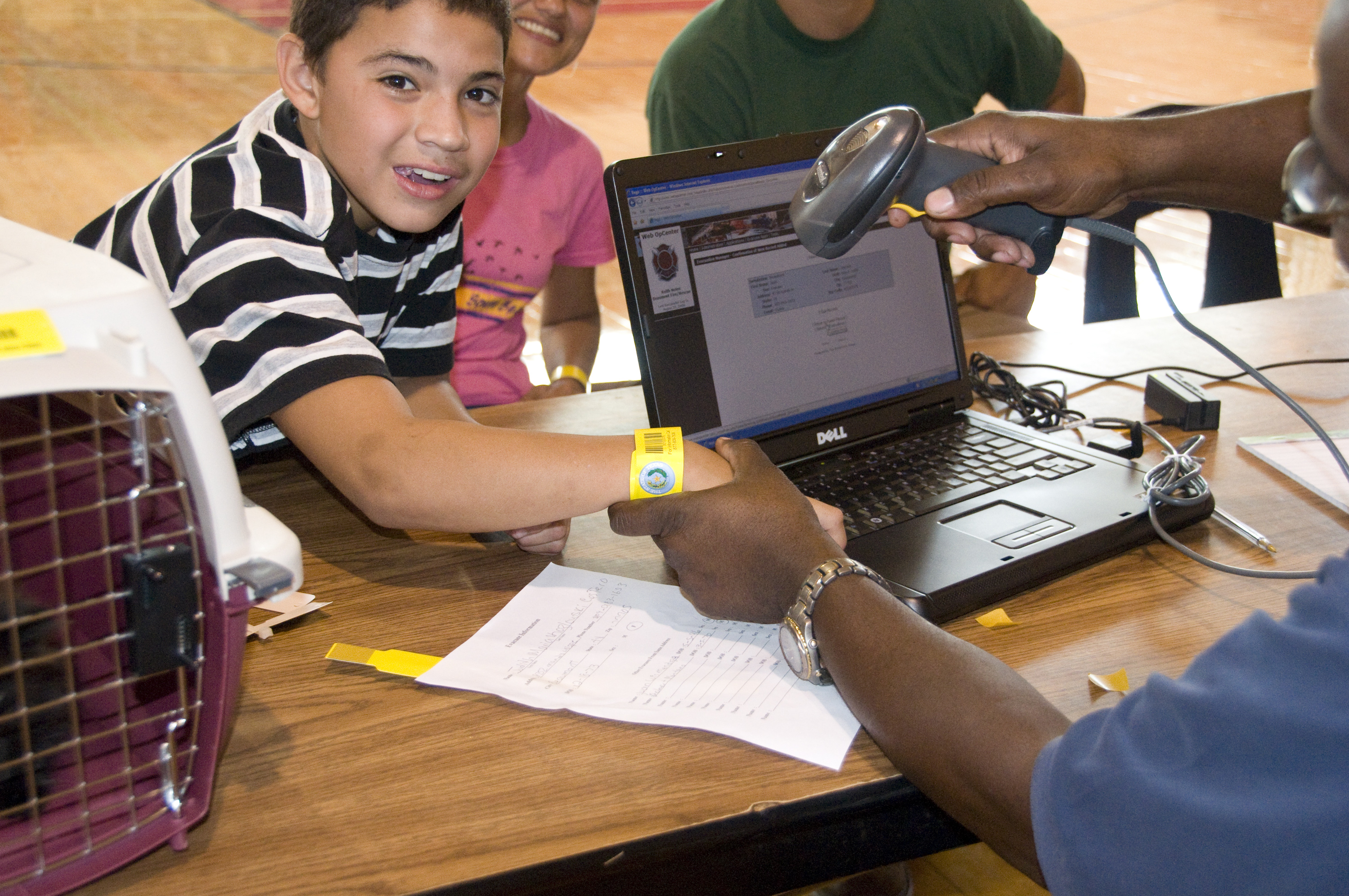
A resident of Beaumont, Texas has his armband scanned as part of a tracking system used to identify residents during a hurricane evacuation in 2008.

A tracking system is a technology used to monitor and record the location and movement of objects or people in real-time or through a historical log. It combines a locating technology, such as GPS, BLE, or RFID, with a software system that collects, processes, and displays the data.

The primary purpose of a tracking system is to provide location-based data to improve efficiency, safety, and security across a wide range of applications. In logistics and fleet management, these systems form the core of modern telematics, enabling companies to optimize routes, monitor assets, and ensure driver safety through methods like driver scoring. They are also used for track and trace solutions in the supply chain, where they are used to ensure product integrity and combat counterfeiting. Beyond commercial use, tracking systems are integral to many consumer services, from personal item finders to ride-hailing apps.

== Applications ==
Tracking systems fall into a few main categories, each with distinct features and applications. Some systems use lag-time indicators, collecting data after an item has passed a specific point. A common example is barcode scanning, where items are scanned at a choke point or gate.

In contrast, real-time or near real-time systems provide more immediate data. Global Positioning Systems (GPS), for instance, track location data continuously, with the "real-time" aspect depending on the refresh rate.

=== Automatic identification and system integration ===
Beyond the timing of data collection, a key distinction lies in how the identification is performed. While some systems, like barcode systems, require a manual scan, others use automatic identification (auto-ID). Radio-Frequency Identification (RFID) is a prime example of auto-ID, which can automatically identify and track items without a direct line of sight.

A challenge in implementing tracking systems is the lack of seamless integration between these technologies. Typically, different applications use separate, discrete hardware and software systems. For instance, a passive RFID system might be used to track boxes within a warehouse, while a separate GPS system with its own software is used to track the truck transporting those boxes. This often results in isolated data silos, making comprehensive, end-to-end tracking difficult.

=== Distribution/warehousing/manufacturing ===
Indoors assets are tracked repetitively reading e.g. a barcode, any passive and active RFID, then, feeding read data into Work in Progress models (WIP) or Warehouse Management Systems (WMS) or ERP software. The readers required per choke point are meshed auto-ID or hand-held ID applications.

However, tracking could also be capable of providing data monitoring without being bound to a fixed location by using a cooperative tracking capability such as an RTLS.

=== Yard management ===
Outdoors mobile assets of high value are tracked by choke point, 802.11, Received Signal Strength Indication (RSSI), Time Delay on Arrival (TDOA), active RFID or GPS Yard Management; feeding into either third party yard management software from the provider or to an existing system. Yard Management Systems (YMS) couple location data collected by RFID and GPS systems to help supply chain managers to optimize utilization of yard assets such as trailers and dock doors. YMS systems can use either active or passive RFID tags.

=== Tool and equipment tracking ===
Tracking systems help manage and locate valuable tools and equipment, particularly in construction and manufacturing. RFID tags or barcodes attached to tools enable automated check-in and check-out. For larger equipment, GPS trackers and dashcams are used to prevent theft, which costs the construction industry over $1 billion annually. Another method is Bluetooth Low Energy (BLE), which is also used for tool tracking. Cost-effective BLE tags can be attached to any tool, and their signals can be read by a network of Bluetooth-enabled devices, most notably the smartphones that workers already carry.

=== Fleet management ===
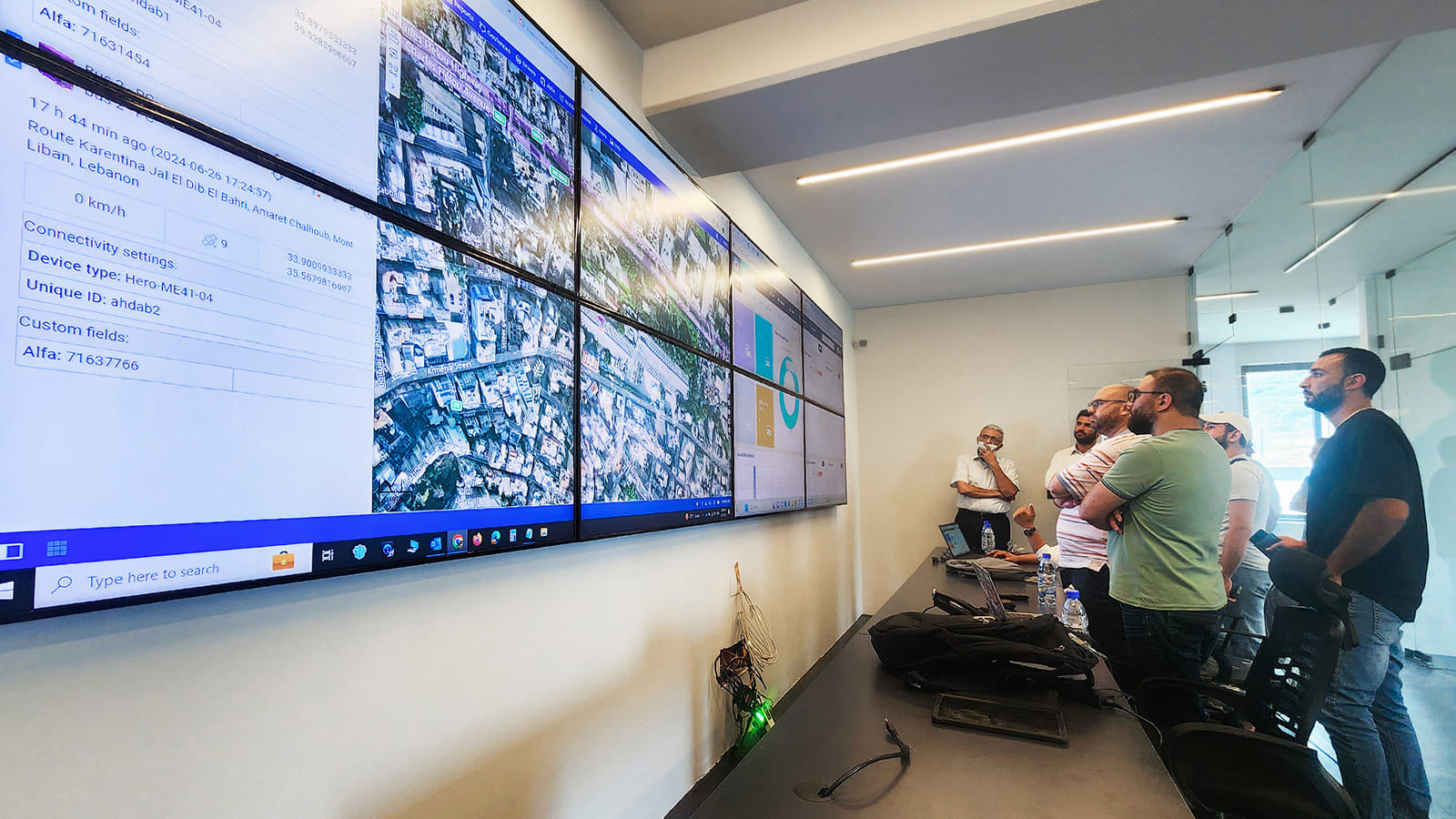
Operators in a control center monitoring a fleet's location and status using a telematics dashboard.

A fleet telematics system uses GPS tracking to reconstruct vehicle routes from successive position measurements. Each vehicle to be tracked is equipped with a GPS tracking unit (often part of a broader telematic control unit) and relays the obtained coordinates via cellular or satellite networks to a home station, providing automatic vehicle location data. Fleet management is required by:

- Large fleet operators, (vehicle/railcars/trucking/shipping)
- Forwarding operators (containers, machines, heavy cargo, valuable shippings)
- Operators who have high equipment and/or cargo/product costs and a need for stolen vehicle recovery
- Operators who have a dynamic workload
- Operations requiring features like video telematics or fuel-management systems to prevent gasoline theft.

=== Person tracking ===
Person tracking relies on unique identifiers that are temporarily (RFID tags) or permanently assigned to persons like personal identifiers (including biometric identifiers), or national identification numbers and a way to sample their positions, either on short temporal scales as through GPS or for public administration to keep track of a state's citizens or temporary residents. Person tracking is used for purposes including welfare administration, public security, and mass surveillance.

==== Attendance management ====
Mobile phone services

Location-based services (LBS) utilise a combination of A-GPS, newer GPS and cellular locating technology that is derived from the telematics and telecom world. Line of sight is not necessarily required for a location fix. This is a significant advantage in certain applications since a GPS signal can still be lost indoors. As such, A-GPS enabled cell phones and PDAs can be located indoors and the handset may be tracked more precisely. This enables non-vehicle centric applications and can bridge the indoor location gap, typically the domain of RFID and Real-time locating system (RTLS) systems, with an off the shelf cellular device.

Currently, A-GPS enabled handsets are still highly dependent on the LBS carrier system, so handset selection and application requirements are still not apparent. Enterprise system integrators require the skills and knowledge to correctly choose the pieces that will fit the application and geography.

=== Research ===
In the life sciences, animal tracking leverages a range of technologies to gather time-resolved data on animal identities, movement, and other behaviors in both wild and controlled environments with minimal human interference. For example, GPS telemetry systems log an animal's location at regular intervals locally, while satellite tags transmit location data remotely. Acoustic tags that communicate with underwater receiver arrays enable passive or active tracking of marine animals. RFID tags also enable contactless identification and behavioral monitoring. For smaller species, including social insects, barcode-based tracking systems allow automated identification and monitoring of hundreds of individuals simultaneously. These technologies vary in spatial and temporal resolution, data volume and handling, energy requirements, and operational range, but have in common that they enable scalable, long-term monitoring of animal movement across diverse environments and biological scales.

== Operational requirements ==
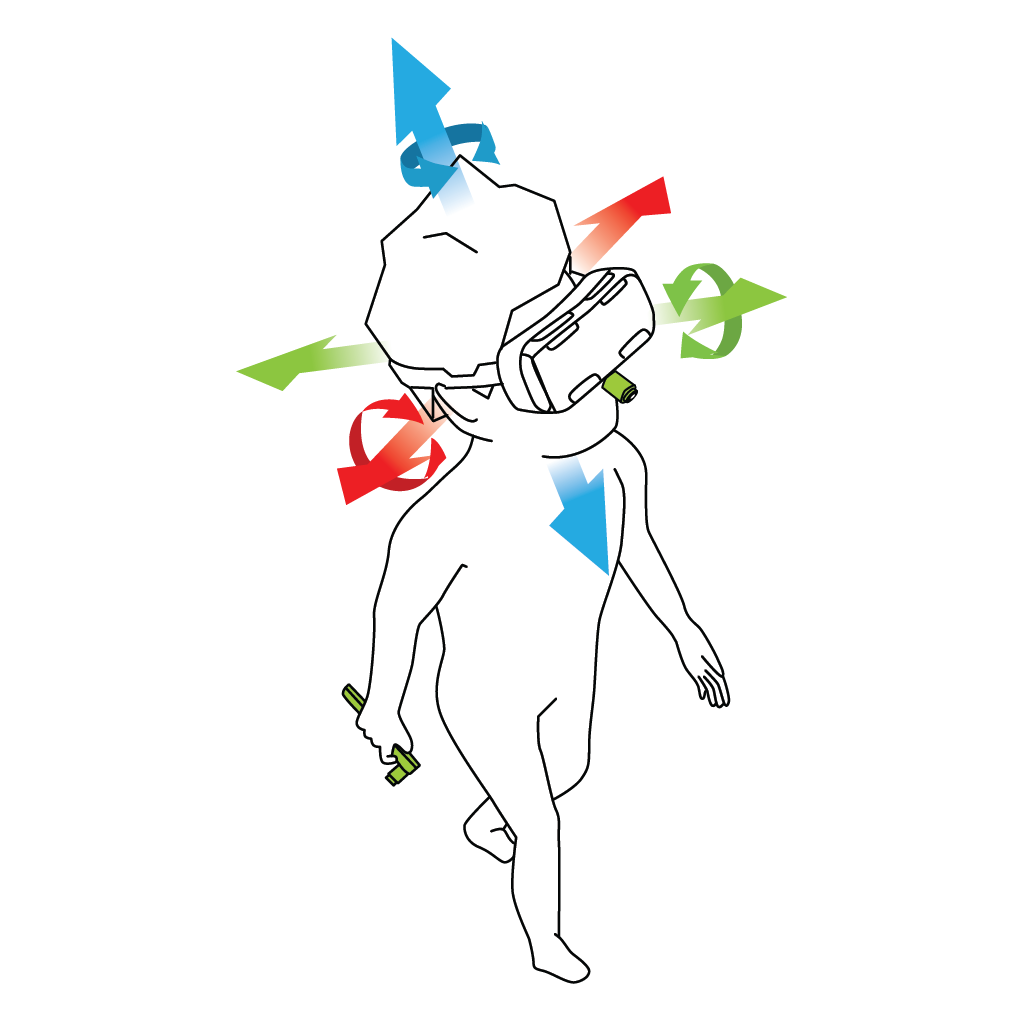
Positional tracking in a virtual reality headset

Different tracking technologies are suited for different conditions and applications, as no single solution fits all use cases. End-user applications often focus on self-location or finding points of interest.

Tracking is used for vehicle tracking in fleet management, asset management, personal navigation, social networking, and mobile resource management. Depending on the context, a company, group, or individual might use a combination of these technologies.

=== GPS tracking ===
GPS has global coverage but can be hindered by line-of-sight issues caused by buildings and urban canyons; Map matching techniques, which involve several algorithms, can help improve accuracy in such conditions. RFID is excellent and reliable indoors or in situations where close proximity to tag readers is feasible, but has limited range and still requires costly readers. RFID stands for Radio Frequency Identification. This technology uses electromagnetic waves to receive the signal from the targeting object to then save the location on a reader that can be looked at through specialized software.

=== Real-time locating systems (RTLS) ===
RTLS are enabled by Wireless LAN systems (according to IEEE 802.11) or other Wireless systems (according to IEEE 802.15) with multilateration. Such equipment is suitable for certain confined areas, such as campuses and office buildings. RTLS requires system-level deployments and server functions to be effective.

=== Bluetooth Low Energy (BLE) ===
BLE tags are inexpensive and energy-efficient, with batteries that can last for years. Its accuracy is moderate, around 2–3 meters, and it can be affected by interference from other electronic devices.

== In virtual space ==
In virtual space technology, a tracking system is generally a system capable of rendering virtual space to a human observer while tracking the observer's coordinates. For instance, in dynamic virtual auditory space simulations, a head tracker provides information to a central processor in real time and this enables the processor to select what functions are necessary to give feedback to the user in relation to where they are positioned.

Additionally, there is vision-based trajectory tracking, that uses a color and depth camera known as a KINECT sensor to track 3D position and movement. This technology can be used in traffic control, human-computer interface, video compression and robotics.

== See also ==
- Data logger
- Geopositioning
- GPS tracking
- Intelligent Mail barcode
- Internet geolocation
- Locating engine
- Location-based service
- MAC address anonymization
- Mass surveillance
- Multilateration
- Positional tracking
- Real-time locating
- RFID in schools
- Simultaneous localization and mapping
- Track and trace
- Vehicle tracking system
