= Conrad Chase =

American singer-songwriter and actor (1965–2024)

Conrad Keven Chase (June 9, 1965 – January 24, 2024) was an American actor, singer-songwriter and public speaker.

== Biography ==
Conrad Keven Chase was born in Portland, Maine, on June 9, 1965. He participated in Spain's Gran Hermano (Big Brother). He was also a member of a Dutch boy band known as the Baja Boys. He released a summer hit in 2004 in Spain called "La Gosadera" together with Juanjo Rocamora, winner of Spain's 2004 Gran Hermano 6. He also was a featuring artist on a hit single "No te quiero mas" together with Las Latinas in 2006.

After serving three years in the U.S. Army Signal Corps as a Telecommunications Center Operator (1983–1986), Chase studied Electronics Technology at the Southern Maine Technical College for two years.

Chase was also known for implementing a system which allowed guests at his night club, the Baja Beach Club, to be implanted with RFID microchips. Customers who carry the chip are allowed access to the VIP area. The system also allows patrons to pay for drinks just by being scanned. It was the first time that RFID technology had been used for this purpose.

Chase was fluent in English, Dutch and Spanish. He died on January 24, 2024, at the age of 58.

== Television ==
- Tele5 – Gran Hermano 6–Finalista (2004)
- Tele5 – A tu Lado
- Tele5 – Crónicas marcianas
- Tele5 – Ana Rosa
- City TV – ArusCity
- City TV – Vitamina N
- TV – Toni Rovira y tu
- Canal Latino – Conrad & Friends
- Canal Catalá – Condició Femenina
- Canal Catalá – Estat de Choc
- Tele5 – Aquí Hay Tomate
- FlaixTV – La Nit
- RTL5 – Way of Life (Holanda)
- SBS6 – Mike Stading Show (Holanda)
- Veronica – Trend Setters (Holanda)
- RNN7 – Night Life Guide (Holanda)
- TMF – Tot Fabienne (Holanda)
- CNN – Technology (International)
- BBC – High Technology (International)

== Film ==
- Plankton, Largometraje en fase de producción – Actor
- The Loop, Corto de terror en fase de rodaje – Actor
- Mi Padre – Actor (2007)

== Music (CDs) ==
- Disco Estrella 2007, song: "No te quiero mas" – Singer
- Filmax 50 Grados 2005, song: "La Gossadera" – Singer
- Filmax 50 Grados 2005 video clip "La Gossadera" – Actor
- The Baja Boys "You to me are everything" – Singer, choreographer (1999)
- The Baja Boys "Celebration" – Singer (1998)

== Sources ==
- Clubbers choose chip implants to jump queues
