= Radio-frequency identification =

Electronic tracking technology

- ISO/IEC and EPCglobal standards for radio-frequency identification
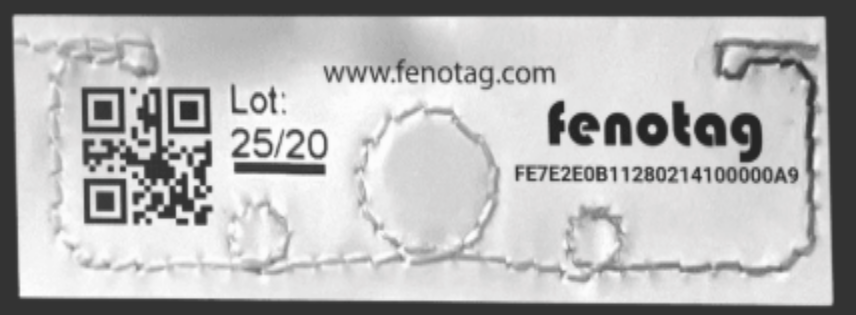
- Textile RFID tag for laundry with printed EPC and QR code
- Abbreviation: RFID
- Status: Published / Standardized
- Year started: 1948 (First conceptualized by Harry Stockman); 1999 (Establishment of the Auto-ID Center)
- Latest version: Multiple (Family of standards)
- Organization: ISO/IEC, GS1 (EPCglobal)
- Committee: ISO/IEC JTC 1/SC 31 (Automatic identification and data capture techniques)
- Base standards: ISO/IEC 18000 series, EPC Gen2 (ISO/IEC 18000-63)
- Related standards: NFC (ISO/IEC 14443 / 18092), Barcodes, ISO/IEC 15693
- Predecessor: Barcode, Magnetic stripe cards
- Domain: Wireless communication, Automatic identification and data capture (AIDC), Logistics
- License: Standard proprietary (ISO/IEC and GS1 licensing models)
- Website: iso.org

Radio-frequency identification (RFID) uses electromagnetic fields to automatically identify and track tags attached to objects. An RFID system consists of a tiny radio transponder called a tag, a radio receiver, and a transmitter. When triggered by an electromagnetic interrogation pulse from a nearby RFID reader device, the tag transmits digital data, usually an identifying inventory number, back to the reader. This number can be used to track inventory goods.

Passive tags are powered by energy from the RFID reader's interrogating radio waves. Active tags are powered by a battery and thus can be read at a greater range from the RFID reader, up to hundreds of meters.

Unlike a barcode, the tag does not need to be within the line of sight of the reader, so it may be embedded in the tracked object. RFID is one method of automatic identification and data capture (AIDC).

RFID tags are used in many industries. For example, an RFID tag attached to an automobile during production can be used to track its progress through the assembly line, RFID-tagged pharmaceuticals can be tracked through warehouses, and implanting RFID microchips in livestock and pets enables positive identification of animals. Tags can also be used in shops to expedite checkout, and to prevent theft by customers and employees.

Since RFID tags can be attached to physical money, clothing, and possessions, or implanted in animals and people, the possibility of reading personally linked information without consent has raised privacy concerns. These concerns resulted in standard specifications development addressing privacy and security issues.

In 2014, the world RFID market was worth US$8.89 billion, up from US$7.77 billion in 2013 and US$6.96 billion in 2012. This figure includes tags, readers, and software/services for RFID cards, labels, fobs, and all other form factors. The market value is expected to rise from US$12.08 billion in 2020 to US$16.23 billion by 2029.

In 2024, about 50 billion tag chips were sold, according to Atlas RFID and RAIN Alliance webinars in July 2025.

== History ==
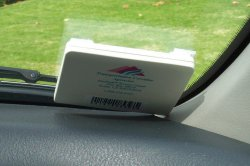
FasTrak, a 915 MHz RFID tag used for electronic toll collection in California

In 1945, Leon Theremin invented the "Thing", a listening device for the Soviet Union that retransmitted incident radio waves with the added audio information. Sound waves vibrated a diaphragm, which slightly altered the shape of the resonator, which modulated the reflected radio frequency. Even though this device was a covert listening device, rather than an identification tag, it is considered to be a predecessor of RFID because it was passive, being energised and activated by waves from an outside source.

Similar technology, such as the Identification friend or foe transponder, was routinely used by the Allies and Germany in World War II to identify aircraft as friendly or hostile. Transponders are still used by most powered aircraft. An early work exploring RFID is the landmark 1948 paper by Harry Stockman, who predicted that "Considerable research and development work has to be done before the remaining basic problems in reflected-power communication are solved, and before the field of useful applications is explored."

Mario Cardullo's device, patented on January 23, 1973, was the first true ancestor of modern RFID, as it was a passive radio transponder with memory. The initial device was passive, powered by the interrogating signal, and was demonstrated in 1971 to the New York Port Authority and other potential users. It consisted of a transponder with 16 bit memory for use as a toll device. The basic Cardullo patent covers the use of radio frequency (RF), sound and light as transmission carriers. The original business plan presented to investors in 1969 showed uses in transportation (automotive vehicle identification, automatic toll system, electronic license plate, electronic manifest, vehicle routing, vehicle performance monitoring), banking (electronic chequebook, electronic credit card), security (personnel identification, automatic gates, surveillance) and medical (identification, patient history).

In 1973, an early demonstration of reflected power (modulated backscatter) RFID tags, both passive and semi-passive, was performed by Steven Depp, Alfred Koelle and Robert Freyman at the Los Alamos National Laboratory. The portable system operated at 915 MHz and used 12-bit tags. This technique is used by the majority of today's UHFID and microwave RFID tags.

In 1983, the first patent to be associated with the abbreviation RFID was granted to Charles Walton.

In 1996, the first patent for a batteryless RFID passive tag with limited interference was granted to David Everett, John Frech, Theodore Wright, and Kelly Rodriguez.

== Design ==
A radio-frequency identification system uses tags, or labels attached to the objects to be identified. Two-way radio transmitter-receivers called interrogators or readers send a signal to the tag and read its response.

=== Tags ===
RFID tags are made out of three pieces:

- a micro chip (an integrated circuit which stores and processes information and modulates and demodulates radio-frequency (RF) signals)
- an antenna for receiving and transmitting the signal
- a substrate

The tag information is stored in non-volatile memory. The RFID tags includes either fixed or programmable logic for processing the transmission and sensor data, respectively.

RFID tags can be either passive, active or battery-assisted passive. An active tag has an on-board battery and periodically transmits its ID signal. A battery-assisted passive tag has a small battery on board and is activated when in the presence of an RFID reader. A passive tag is cheaper and smaller because it has no battery; instead, the tag uses the radio energy transmitted by the reader. However, to operate a passive tag, it must be illuminated with a power level roughly a thousand times stronger than an active tag for signal transmission.

Tags may either be read-only, having a factory-assigned serial number that is used as a key into a database, or may be read/write, where object-specific data can be written into the tag by the system user. Field programmable tags may be write-once, read-multiple; blank tags may be written with an electronic product code by the user.

The RFID tag receives the message and then responds with its identification and other information. This may be only a unique tag serial number, or may be product-related information such as a stock number, lot or batch number, production date, or other specific information. Since tags have individual serial numbers, the RFID system design can discriminate among several tags that might be within the range of the RFID reader and read them simultaneously.

=== Readers ===
RFID systems can be classified by the type of tag and reader. There are 3 types:

- A passive reader active tag (PRAT) system has a passive reader which only receives radio signals from active tags (battery-operated, transmit only). The reception range of a PRAT system reader can be adjusted from 1–2,000 feet (0–600 m), allowing flexibility in applications such as asset protection and supervision.
- An active reader passive tag (ARPT) system has an active reader, which transmits interrogator signals and also receives authentication replies from passive tags.
- An active reader active tag (ARAT) system uses active tags activated with an interrogator signal from the active reader. A variation of this system could also use a battery-assisted passive (BAP) tag, which acts like a passive tag but has a small battery to power the tag's return reporting signal.

Fixed readers are set up to create a specific interrogation zone which can be tightly controlled. This allows a highly defined reading area for when tags go in and out of the interrogation zone. Mobile readers may be handheld or mounted on carts or vehicles.

=== Frequencies ===
RFID frequency bands
Band	Regulations	Range	Data speed	ISO/IEC 18000 section	Remarks	Approximate tag cost in volume (2006)
LF: 120–150 kHz	Unregulated	10 cm (4 in)	Low	Part 2	Animal identification, factory data collection, older door access control	US$1
HF: 13.56 MHz	ISM band worldwide	0.1–1 m (4 in – 3 ft 3 in)	Low to moderate	Part 3	Smart cards (ISO/IEC 15693, ISO/IEC 14443 A, B), ISO-non-compliant smart cards (iCLASS, Legic, FeliCa ...), ISO-compatible smart cards (MIFARE, Seos), newer door access systems	US$0.05 to US$5
UHF: 433 MHz	Short-range devices	1–100 m (3–300 ft)	Moderate	Part 7	Defense applications, Underground Miner Tracking with active tags	US$5
UHF: 865–868 MHz (Europe); 902–928 MHz (North America)	ISM band	1–12 m (3–40 ft)	Moderate to high	Part 6	EAN, various standards; used by railroads	US$0.04 to US$1.00 (passive tags)
microwave: 2450–5800 MHz	ISM band	1–2 m (3–7 ft)	High	Part 4	802.11 WLAN, Bluetooth standards	US$25 (active tags)
microwave: 3.1–10 GHz	Ultra wide band	up to 200 m (700 ft)	High	Not defined	Requires semi-active or active tags	US$5 projected
mm-wave: 24.125 GHz	ISM band worldwide	10–200 m (30–700 ft)	High	Not defined	Requires semi-passive tags. Uses retrodirective backscatter approaches to achieve extended ranges	US$10 projected

=== Signaling ===
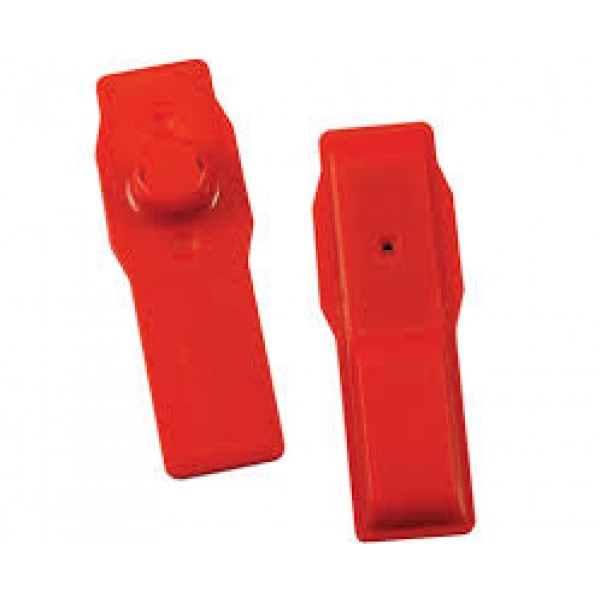
RFID hard tag

Signaling between the reader and the tag is done in several different incompatible ways, depending on the frequency band used by the tag. Tags operating on LF and HF bands are, in terms of radio wavelength, very close to the reader antenna because they are only a small percentage of a wavelength away. In this near field region, the tag is closely coupled electrically with the transmitter in the reader. The tag can modulate the field produced by the reader by changing the electrical loading the tag represents. By switching between lower and higher relative loads, the tag produces a change that the reader can detect. At UHF and higher frequencies, the tag is more than one radio wavelength away from the reader, requiring a different approach. The tag can backscatter a signal. Active tags may contain functionally separated transmitters and receivers, and the tag need not respond on a frequency related to the reader's interrogation signal.

An Electronic Product Code (EPC) is one common type of data stored in a tag. When written into the tag by an RFID printer, the tag contains a 96-bit string of data. The first eight bits are a header which identifies the version of the protocol. The next 28 bits identify the organization that manages the data for this tag; the organization number is assigned by the EPCGlobal consortium. The next 24 bits are an object class, identifying the kind of product. The last 36 bits are a unique serial number for a particular tag. These last two fields are set by the organization that issued the tag. Rather like a URL, the total electronic product code number can be used as a key into a global database to uniquely identify a particular product.

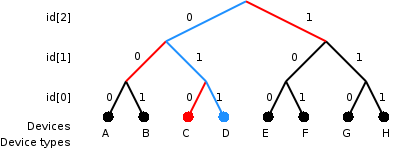
An example of a binary tree method of identifying an RFID tag

Often more than one tag will respond to a tag reader. For example, many individual products with tags may be shipped in a common box or on a common pallet. Collision detection is important to allow reading of data in these situations. Two different types of protocols are used to singulate a particular tag, allowing its data to be read in the midst of many similar tags: In a Slotted Aloha system, the reader broadcasts an initialization command and a parameter that the tags individually use to pseudo-randomly delay their responses. When using an adaptive binary tree protocol, the reader sends an initialization symbol and then transmits one bit of ID data at a time; only tags with matching bits respond, and eventually only one tag matches the complete ID string. Both methods have drawbacks when used with many tags or with multiple overlapping readers.

=== Bulk reading ===
Bulk reading is a strategy for interrogating multiple tags at the same time, but lacks sufficient precision for inventory control. A group of objects, all of them RFID tagged, are read completely from one single reader position at one time. However, as tags respond strictly sequentially, the time needed for bulk reading grows linearly with the number of labels to be read. This means it takes at least twice as long to read twice as many labels. Due to collision effects, the time required is greater.

A group of tags has to be illuminated by the interrogating signal just like a single tag. This is not a challenge concerning energy, but with respect to visibility; if any of the tags are shielded by other tags, they might not be sufficiently illuminated to return a sufficient response. The response conditions for inductively coupled HF RFID tags and coil antennas in magnetic fields appear better than for UHF or SHF dipole fields, but then distance limits apply and may prevent success.

Under operational conditions, bulk reading is not reliable. Bulk reading can be a rough guide for logistics decisions, but due to a high proportion of reading failures, it is not currently suitable for inventory management. However, when a single RFID tag might be seen as not guaranteeing a proper read, multiple RFID tags, where at least one will respond, may be a safer approach for detecting a known grouping of objects. In this respect, bulk reading is a fuzzy method for process support. From the perspective of cost and effect, bulk reading is not reported as an economical approach to secure process control in logistics.

=== Miniaturization ===
RFID tags are easy to conceal or incorporate in other items. For example, in 2009, researchers at Bristol University successfully glued RFID micro-transponders to live ants in order to study their behavior. This trend towards increasingly miniaturized RFIDs is likely to continue as technology advances.

Hitachi holds the record for the smallest RFID chip, at 0.05 mm × 0.05 mm. This is 1/64th the size of the previous record holder, the mu-chip. Manufacture is enabled by using the silicon-on-insulator (SOI) process. These dust-sized chips can store 38-digit numbers using 128-bit read-only memory (ROM). A major challenge is the attachment of antennas, thus limiting read range to only millimeters.

==== TFID (Terahertz Frequency Identification) ====
In early 2020, MIT researchers demonstrated a terahertz frequency identification (TFID) tag that is barely 1 square millimeter in size. The devices are essentially a piece of silicon that are inexpensive, small, and function like larger RFID tags. Because of the small size, manufacturers could tag any product and track logistics information for minimal cost.

== Uses ==
An RFID tag can be affixed to an object and used to track tools, equipment, inventory, assets, people, or other objects.

RFID offers advantages over manual systems or use of barcodes. The tag can be read if passed near a reader, even if it is covered by the object or not visible. The tag can be read inside a case, carton, box or other container, and unlike barcodes, RFID tags can be read hundreds at a time; barcodes can only be read one at a time using current devices. Some RFID tags, such as battery-assisted passive tags, are also able to monitor temperature and humidity.

In 2011, the cost of passive tags started at US$0.09 each; special tags, meant to be mounted on metal or withstand gamma sterilization, could cost up to US$5. Active tags for tracking containers, medical assets, or monitoring environmental conditions in data centers started at US$50 and could be over US$100 each. Battery-Assisted Passive (BAP) tags were in the US$3–10 range.

RFID can be used in a variety of applications, such as:

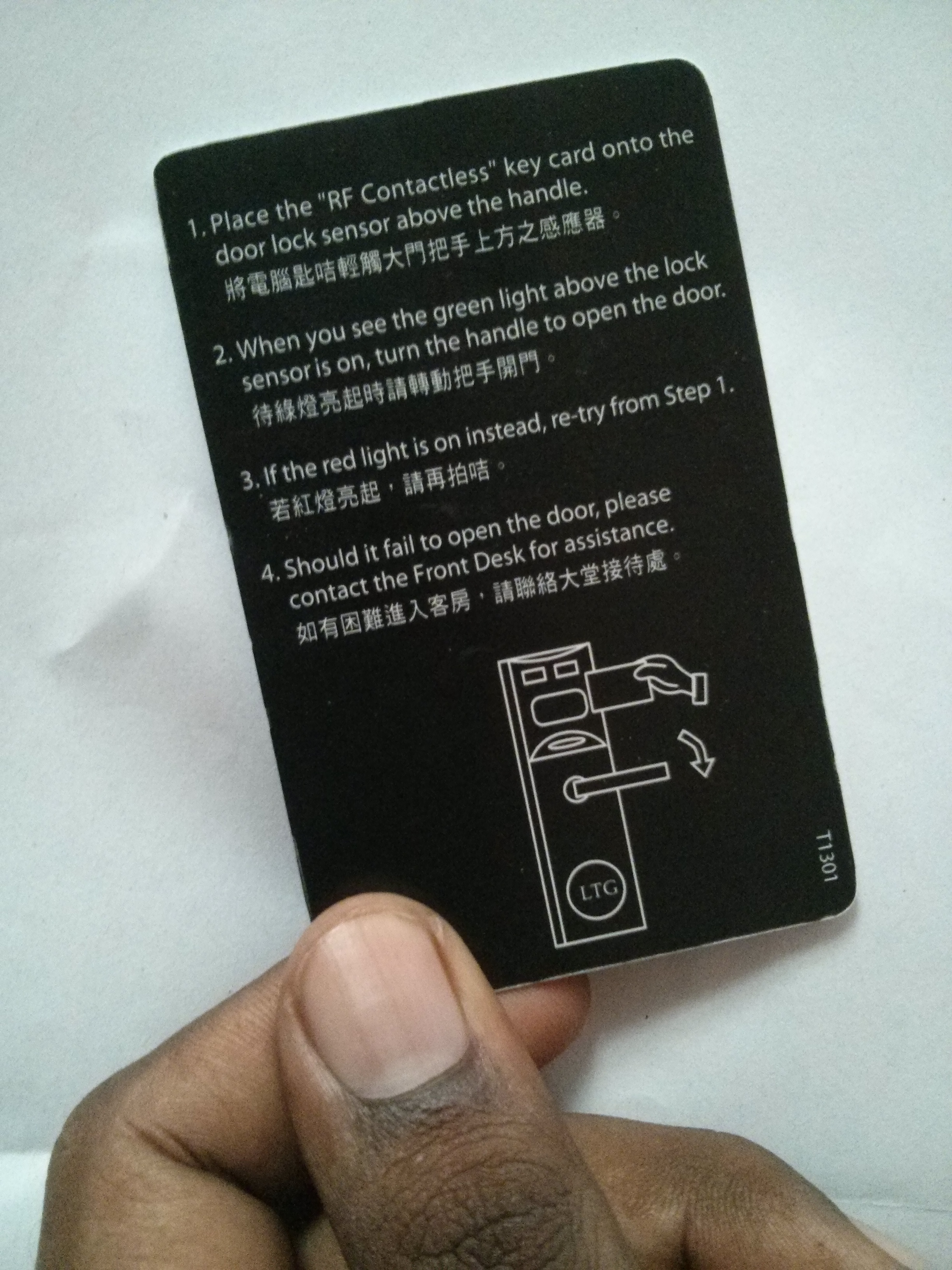
Electronic key for RFID based lock system

- Access management
- Tracking of goods
- Tracking of persons and animals
- Toll collection and contactless payment
- Machine readable travel documents
- Smartdust (for massively distributed sensor networks)
- Locating lost airport baggage
- Timing sporting events
- Tracking and billing processes
- Monitoring the physical state of perishable goods

In 2010, three factors drove a significant increase in RFID usage: decreased cost of equipment and tags, increased performance to a reliability of 99.9%, and a stable international standard around HF and UHF passive RFID. The adoption of these standards were driven by EPCglobal, a joint venture between GS1 and GS1 US, which were responsible for driving global adoption of the barcode in the 1970s and 1980s. The EPCglobal Network was developed by the Auto-ID Center.

=== Commerce ===
An EPC RFID tag used by Walmart

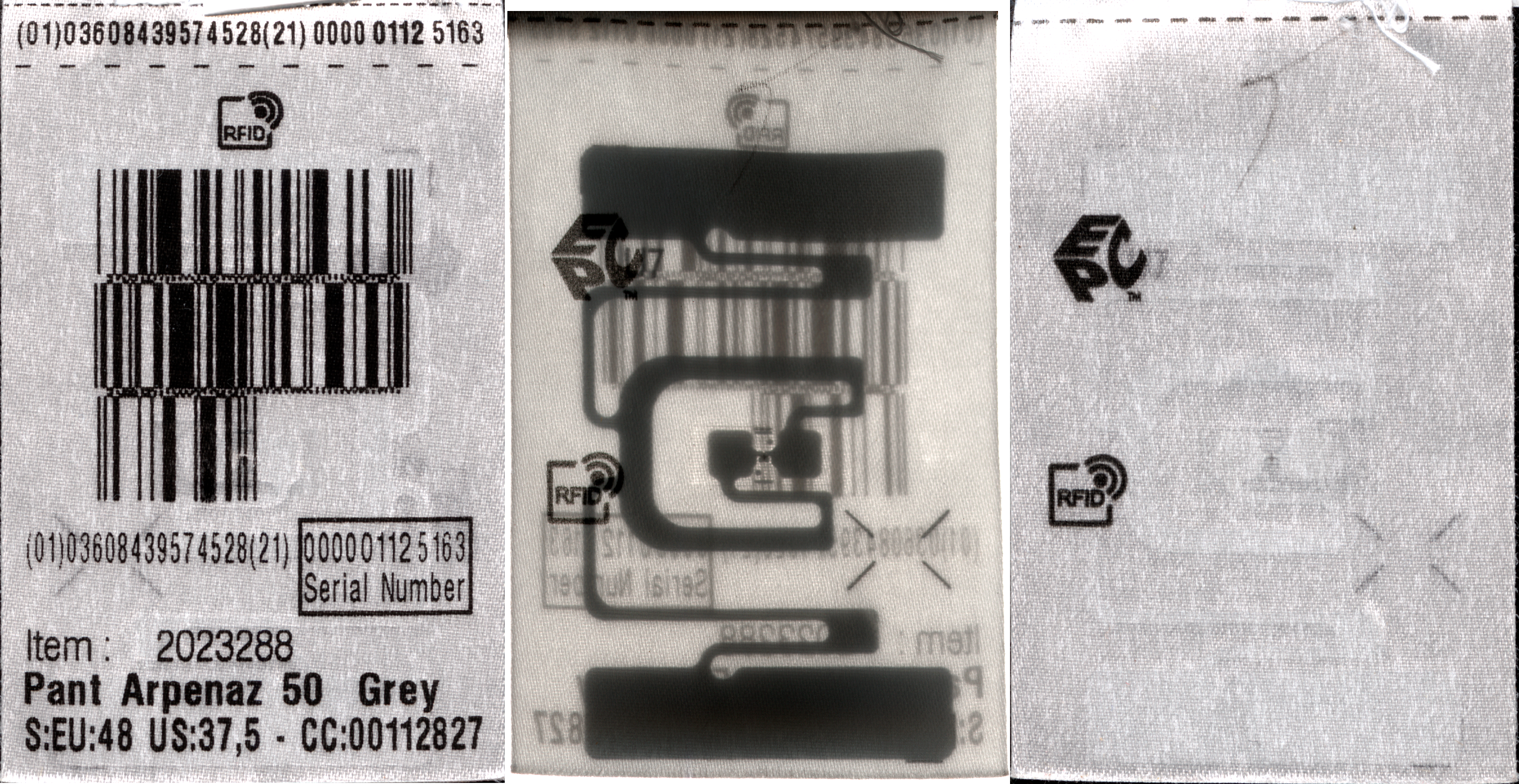
Sewn-in RFID label in garment manufactured by the French sports supplier Decathlon. Front, back, and transparency scan.

In e-commerce, RFID technology is used for three purposes: tracking, inventory management and validation. Each of these functions can provide benefits, including cost savings and improved productivity. Tracking involves using RFID to follow a product through the supply chain and clinical workflow. It can be used to track a product to a particular patient and identify the clinician who used the product during patient care. RFID reduces the time required to locate or track products, thereby making the process more efficient.

Inventory management is an important aspect of managing an organization. It enables managers to monitor usage patterns throughout the organization. It is a complex process that involves determining what is in stock, how much is available, who has it, where it is located and when it needs to be reordered. RFID helps manage patient inventories by ensuring that the appropriate assets are available when and where they are needed.

Validation confirms that an action has taken place or that the required item is available. Like tracking, validation through RFID technology can reduce medical errors, monitor productivity and help produce the necessary documentation for administrative and auditing purposes. Validation is a method of ensuring quality in healthcare settings. One of its main functions is to verify that the patient receiving treatment is the correct patient and that the planned treatment is appropriate. For example, in China, Cainiao has used RFID technology to monitor and manage green logistics, particularly reusable logistics boxes and cross-border parcels. According to the 2021 Double 11 Cainiao Green Logistics Report, during the 2021 Double 11 shopping event, Cainiao's green logistics initiatives, supported by the use of RFID technology, reduced carbon emissions by 53,000 tonnes. RFID technology in green product production enables real-time inventory tracking, reducing misplacement and product losses.

During the recycling of waste products, RFID records product information to improve recycling efficiency and recovery rates. Implementing RFID throughout the green supply chain can improve overall operational performance and economic returns, reduce the environmental impact of waste, support corporate social responsibility and contribute to a positive corporate image.

==== Retail ====
RFID is used for item-level tagging in retail stores. This can enable more accurate and lower-labor-cost supply chain and store inventory tracking, as is done at Lululemon, though physically locating items in stores requires more expensive technology. RFID tags can be used at checkout; for example, at some stores of the French retailer Decathlon, customers perform self-checkout by either using a smartphone or putting items into a bin near the register that scans the tags without having to orient each one toward the scanner. Some stores use RFID-tagged items to trigger systems that provide customers with more information or suggestions, such as fitting rooms at Chanel and the "Color Bar" at Kendra Scott stores.

Item tagging can also provide protection against theft by customers and employees by using electronic article surveillance (EAS). Tags of different types can be physically removed with a special tool or deactivated electronically when payment is made. On leaving the shop, customers have to pass near an RFID detector; if they have items with active RFID tags, an alarm sounds, indicating an unpaid-for item.

Casinos can use RFID to authenticate poker chips, and can selectively invalidate any chips known to be stolen.

==== Access control ====
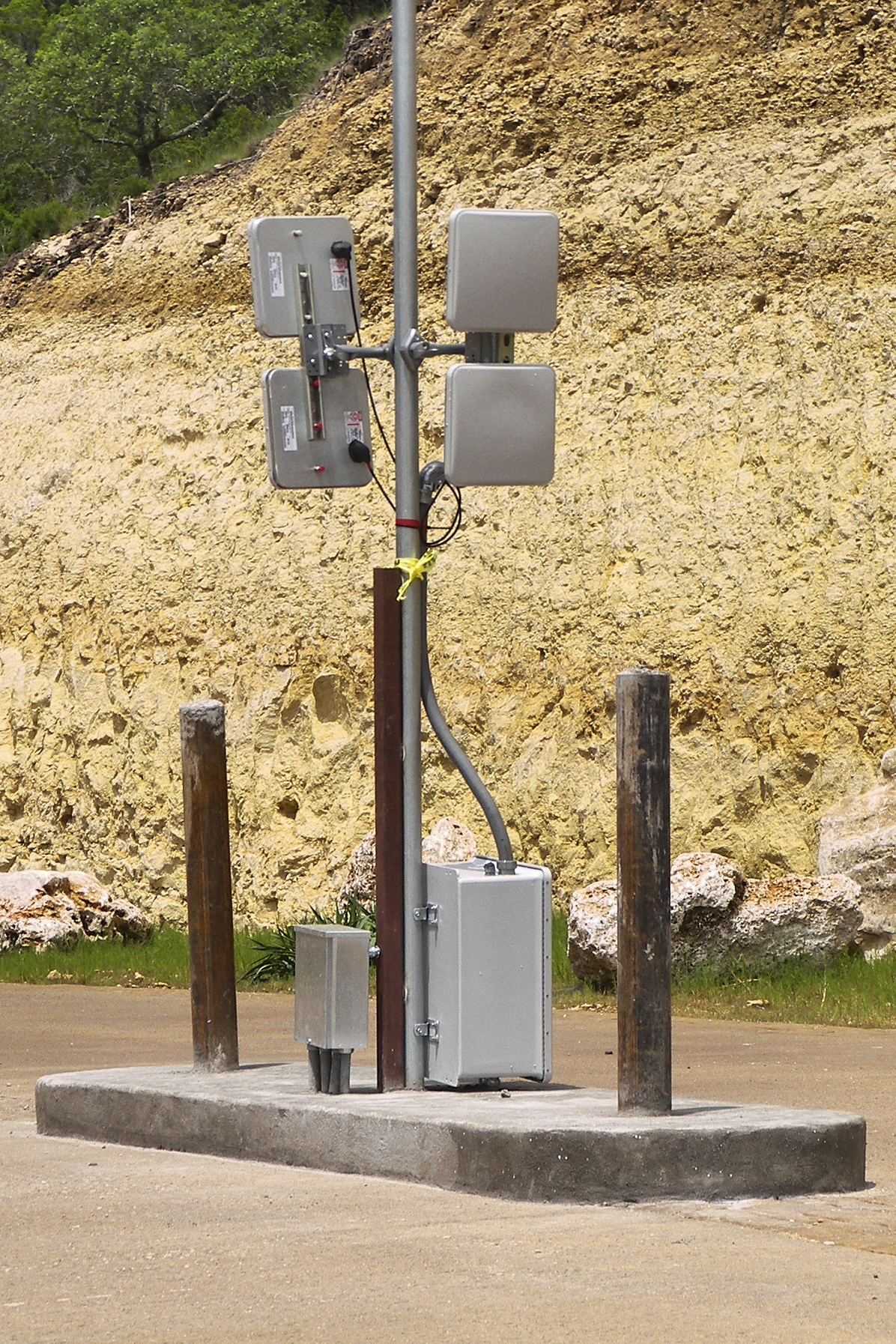
RFID antenna for vehicular access control

RFID tags are widely used in identification badges, replacing earlier magnetic stripe cards. Older systems use proprietary protocols at a low frequency. Newer ones tend to use the MIFARE smart card protocol. These badges need only be held within a certain distance of the reader to authenticate the holder. Tags can also be placed on vehicles, which can be read at a distance, to allow entrance to controlled areas without having to stop the vehicle and present a card or enter an access code.

==== Advertising ====
In 2010, Vail Resorts began using UHF Passive RFID tags in ski passes.

Automotive brands have adopted RFID for social media product placement more quickly than other industries. Mercedes was an early adopter in 2011 at the PGA Golf Championships, and a Hyundai stand in the 2013 Geneva Motor Show uses RFID for streamlining social activation marketing.

==== Promotion tracking ====
To prevent retailers diverting products, manufacturers are exploring the use of RFID tags on promoted merchandise so that they can track exactly which product has sold through the supply chain at fully discounted prices.

=== Transportation and logistics ===
Yard management, shipping and freight and distribution centers use RFID tracking. In the railroad industry, RFID tags mounted on locomotives and rolling stock identify the owner, identification number and type of equipment and its characteristics. This can be used with a database to identify the type, origin, destination, etc. of the commodities being carried.

In commercial aviation, RFID is used to support maintenance on commercial aircraft. A standard for RFID baggage tags has been established by the IATA at the Passenger Services Conference in Geneva of November 2005. The Las Vegas McCarran International Airport and Hong Kong International Airport were among several airports to have tests conducted, concurring the presence of functional RFID baggage tags.

Some countries are using RFID for vehicle registration and enforcement. RFID can help detect and retrieve stolen cars.

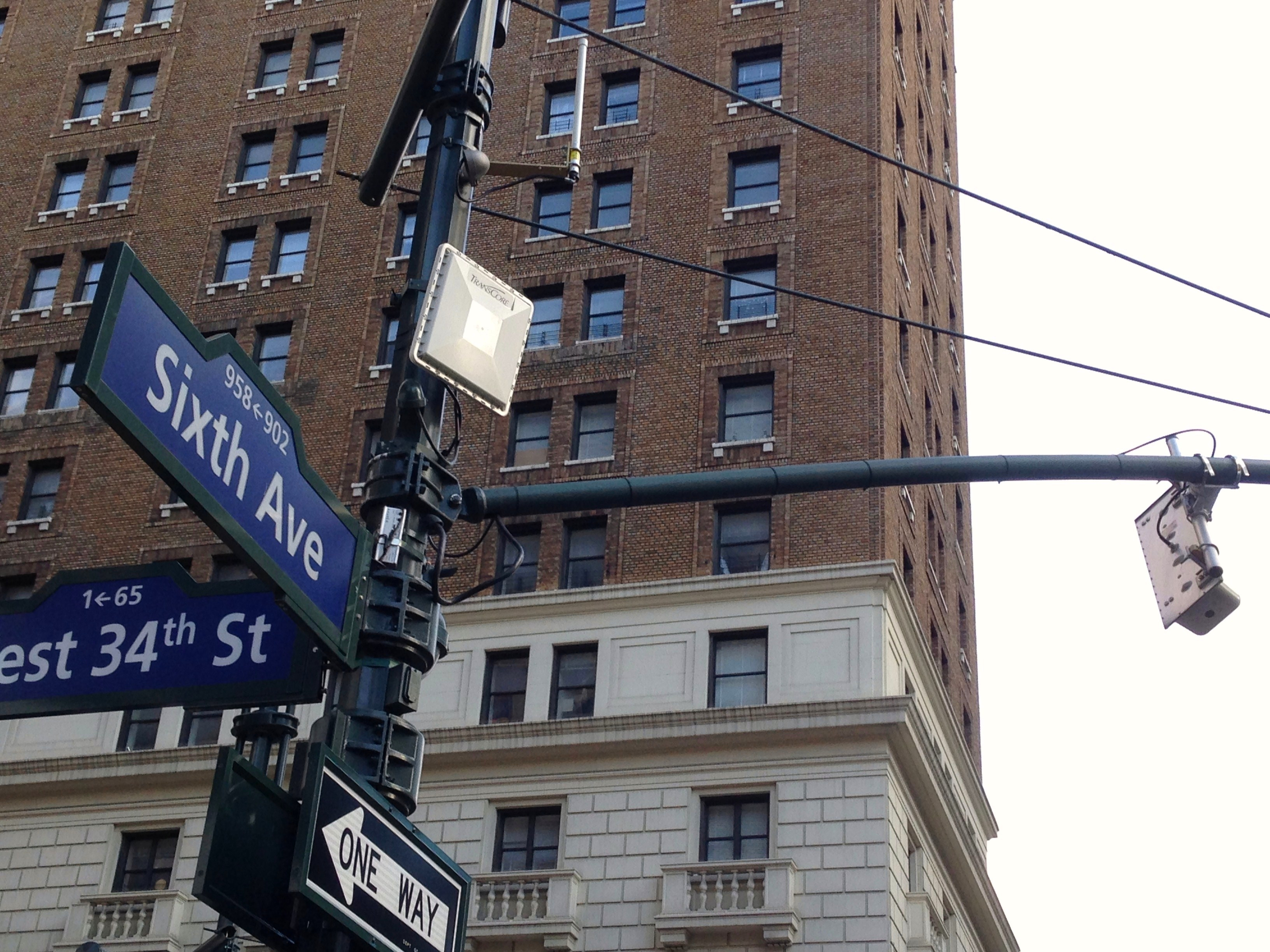
RFID E-ZPass reader attached to the pole and mast arm (right) used in traffic monitoring in New York City

RFID is used in intelligent transportation systems. In New York City, RFID readers are deployed at intersections to track E-ZPass tags as a means for monitoring the traffic flow. The data is fed through the broadband wireless infrastructure to the traffic management center to be used in adaptive traffic control of the traffic lights.

Where ship, rail, or highway tanks are being loaded, a fixed RFID antenna contained in a transfer hose can read an RFID tag affixed to the tank, positively identifying it.

=== Infrastructure management and protection ===
At least one company has introduced RFID to identify and locate underground infrastructure assets such as gas pipelines, sewer lines, electrical cables, communication cables, etc.

=== Passports ===
The first RFID passports ("E-passport") were issued by Malaysia in 1998. In addition to information also contained on the visual data page of the passport, Malaysian e-passports record the travel history (time, date, and place) of entry into and exit out of the country.

Other countries that insert RFID in passports include Norway (2005), Japan (March 1, 2006), most EU countries (around 2006), Singapore (2006), Australia, Hong Kong, the United States (2007), the United Kingdom and Northern Ireland (2006), India (June 2008), Serbia (July 2008), Republic of Korea (August 2008), Taiwan (December 2008), Albania (January 2009), The Philippines (August 2009), Republic of Macedonia (2010), Argentina (2012), Canada (2013), Uruguay (2015) and Israel (2017).

Standards for RFID passports are determined by the International Civil Aviation Organization (ICAO), and are contained in ICAO Document 9303, Part 1, Volumes 1 and 2 (6th edition, 2006). ICAO refers to the ISO/IEC 14443 RFID chips in e-passports as "contactless integrated circuits". ICAO standards provide for e-passports to be identifiable by a standard e-passport logo on the front cover.

Since 2006, RFID tags included in new United States passports store the same information that is printed within the passport, and include a digital picture of the owner. The United States Department of State initially stated the chips could only be read from a distance of 10 centimetres (3.9 in), but after widespread criticism and a clear demonstration that special equipment can read the test passports from 10 metres (33 ft) away, the passports were designed to incorporate a thin metal lining to make it more difficult for unauthorized readers to skim information when the passport is closed. The department will also implement Basic Access Control (BAC), which functions as a personal identification number (PIN) in the form of characters printed on the passport data page. Before a passport's tag can be read, this PIN must be entered into an RFID reader. The BAC also enables the encryption of any communication between the chip and interrogator.

=== Transportation payments ===
In many countries, RFID tags can be used to pay for mass transit fares on bus, trains, or subways, or to collect tolls on highways.

Some bike lockers are operated with RFID cards assigned to individual users. A prepaid card is required to open or enter a facility or locker and is used to track and charge based on how long the bike is parked.

The Zipcar car-sharing service uses RFID cards for locking and unlocking cars and for member identification.

In Singapore, RFID replaces paper Season Parking Ticket (SPT).

=== Animal identification ===
CCIA and DairyTrace ISO standard electronic cattle ear tags used in Canada

RFID tags for animals represent one of the earliest uses of RFID. Originally meant for large ranches and rough terrain, since the outbreak of mad-cow disease, RFID has become crucial in animal identification management. An implantable RFID tag or transponder can also be used for animal identification. The transponders are better known as Passive Integrated Transponder (PIT) tags, passive RFID, or chips on animals. The Canadian Cattle Identification Agency began using RFID tags as a replacement for barcode tags. Currently, CCIA tags are used in Wisconsin and by United States farmers on a voluntary basis. The USDA is currently developing its own program.

RFID tags are required for all cattle sold in Australia and in some states, sheep and goats as well.

=== Human implantation ===
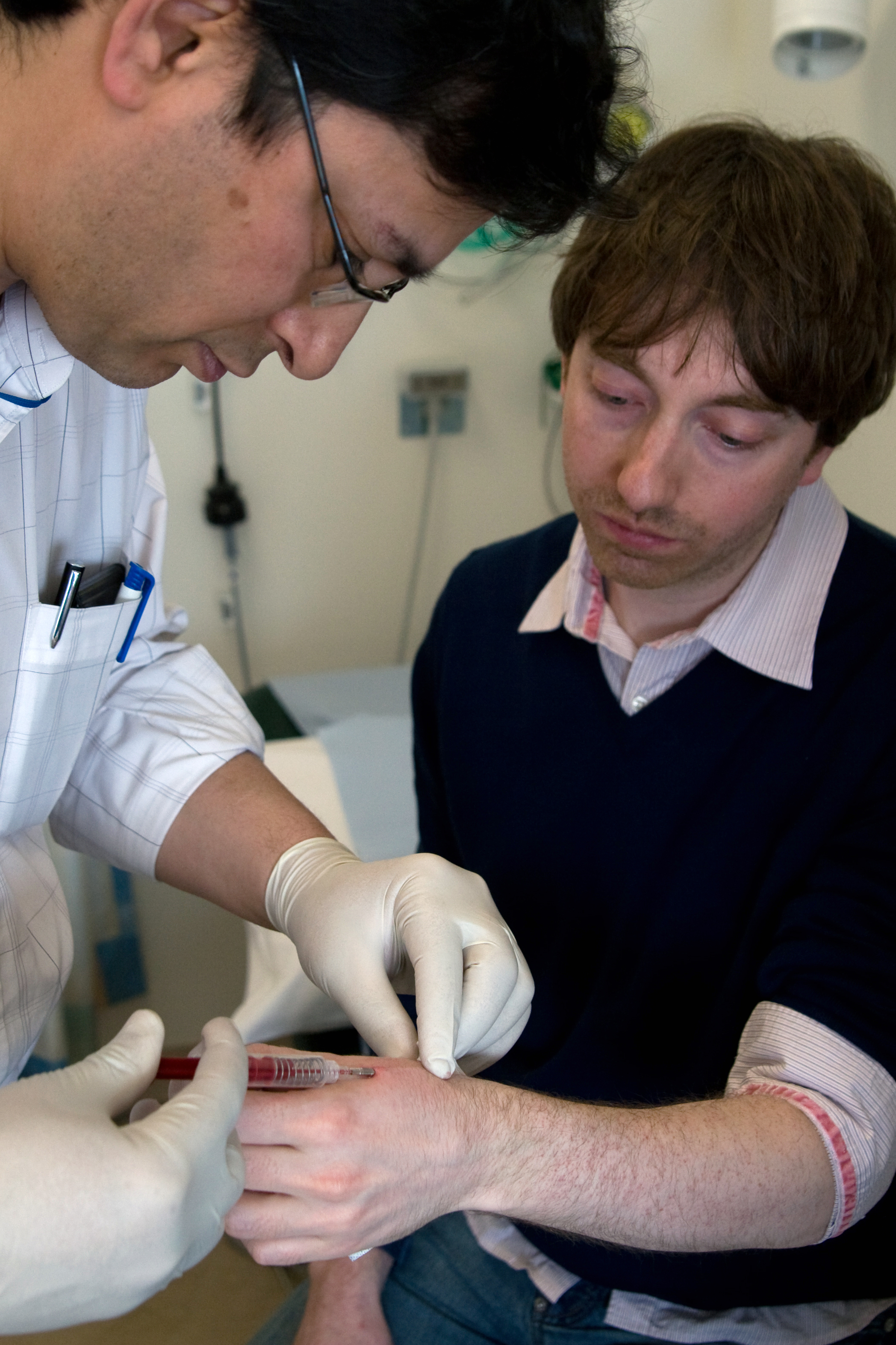
A surgeon implants an RFID microchip into the left hand of Dr. Mark Gasson (March 16, 2009).

Biocompatible microchip implants that use RFID technology are being routinely implanted in humans. The first-ever human to receive an RFID microchip implant was American artist Eduardo Kac in 1997. Kac implanted the microchip live on television (and also live on the Internet) in the context of his artwork Time Capsule. A year later, British professor of cybernetics Kevin Warwick had an RFID chip implanted in his arm by his general practitioner, George Boulos. In 2004, the 'Baja Beach Club' operated by Conrad Chase in Barcelona and Rotterdam offered implanted chips to identify their VIP customers, who could in turn use it to pay for service. In 2009, British scientist Mark Gasson had an advanced glass capsule RFID device surgically implanted into his left hand and subsequently demonstrated how a computer virus could wirelessly infect his implant and then be transmitted on to other systems.

The Food and Drug Administration in the United States approved the use of RFID chips in humans in 2004.

There is controversy regarding human applications of implantable RFID technology including concerns that individuals could potentially be tracked by carrying an identifier unique to them. Privacy advocates have protested against implantable RFID chips, warning of potential abuse. Some are concerned this could lead to abuse by an authoritarian government, to removal of freedoms, and to the emergence of an "ultimate panopticon", a society where all citizens behave in a socially accepted manner because others might be watching.

On July 22, 2006, Reuters reported that two hackers, Newitz and Westhues, at a conference in New York City demonstrated that they could clone the RFID signal from a human implanted RFID chip, indicating that the device was not as secure as was previously claimed.

The UFO religion Universe People is notorious online for their vocal opposition to human RFID chipping, which they claim is a saurian attempt to enslave the human race; one of their web domains is "dont-get-chipped".

=== Institutions ===
==== Hospitals and healthcare ====
Adoption of RFID in the medical industry has been widespread and very effective. Hospitals are among the first users to combine both active and passive RFID. Active tags track high-value, or frequently moved items, and passive tags track smaller, lower cost items that only need room-level identification. Medical facility rooms can collect data from transmissions of RFID badges worn by patients and employees, as well as from tags assigned to items such as mobile medical devices. The U.S. Department of Veterans Affairs (VA) recently announced plans to deploy RFID in hospitals across America to improve care and reduce costs.

Since 2004, a number of U.S. hospitals have begun implanting patients with RFID tags and using RFID systems; the systems are typically used for workflow and inventory management. The use of RFID to prevent mix-ups between sperm and ova in IVF clinics is also being considered.

In October 2004, the FDA approved the USA's first RFID chips that can be implanted in humans. The 134 kHz RFID chips, from VeriChip Corp. can incorporate personal medical information and could save lives and limit injuries from errors in medical treatments, according to the company. Anti-RFID activists Katherine Albrecht and Liz McIntyre discovered an FDA Warning Letter that spelled out health risks. According to the FDA, these include "adverse tissue reaction", "migration of the implanted transponder", "failure of implanted transponder", "electrical hazards" and "magnetic resonance imaging [MRI] incompatibility."

==== Libraries ====
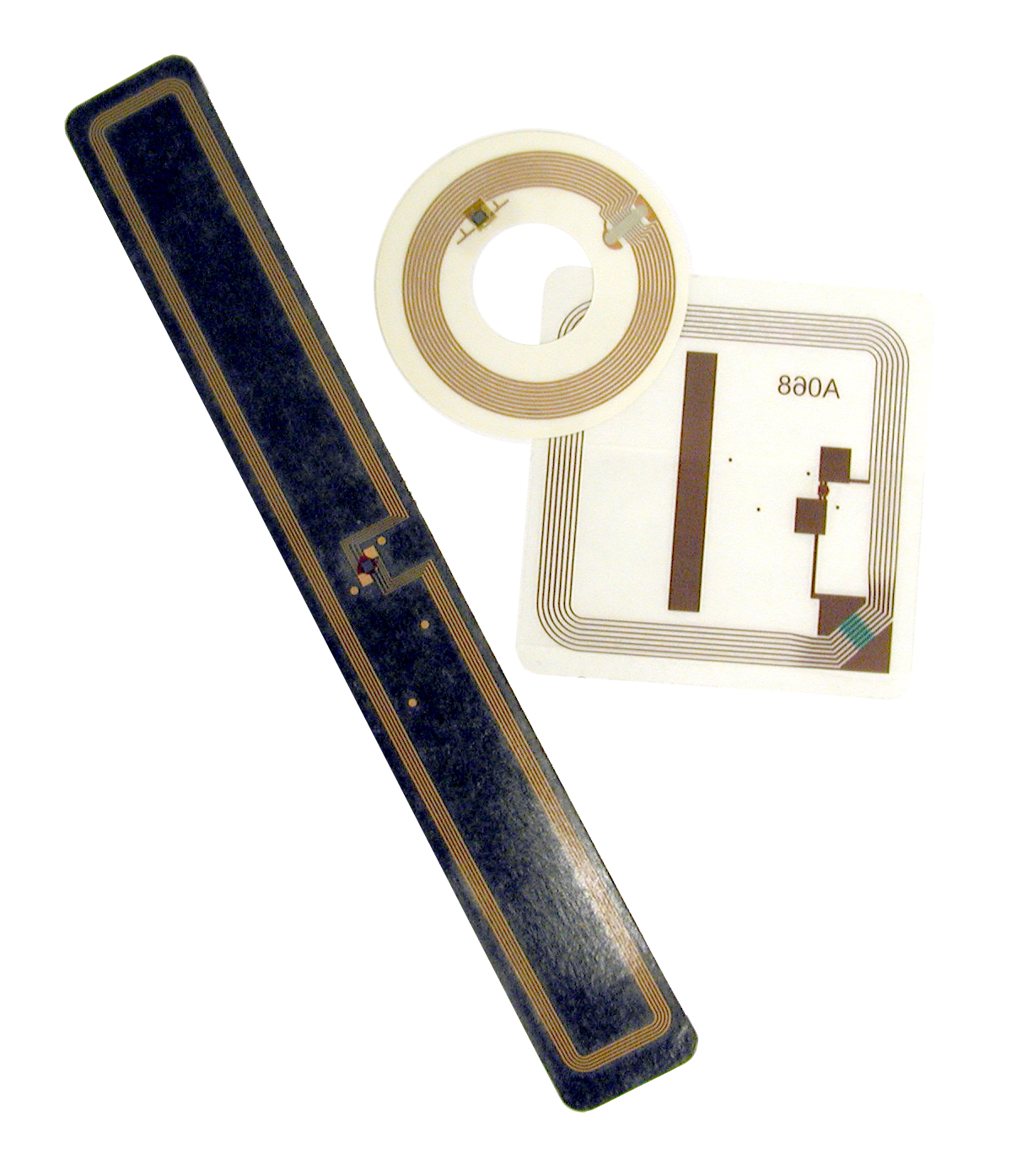
RFID tags used in libraries: square book tag, round CD/DVD tag and rectangular VHS tag

Libraries have used RFID to replace the barcodes on library items. The tag can contain identifying information or may just be a key into a database. An RFID system may replace or supplement bar codes and may offer another method of inventory management and self-service checkout by patrons. It can also act as a security device, taking the place of the more traditional electromagnetic security strip.

It is estimated that over 30 million library items worldwide now contain RFID tags, including some in the Vatican Library in Rome.

Since RFID tags can be read through an item, there is no need to open a book cover or DVD case to scan an item, and a stack of books can be read simultaneously. Book tags can be read while books are in motion on a conveyor belt, which reduces staff time. This can all be done by the borrowers themselves, reducing the need for library staff assistance. With portable readers, inventories could be done on a whole shelf of materials within seconds. However, as of 2008, this technology remained too costly for many smaller libraries, and the conversion period has been estimated at 11 months for an average-size library. A 2004 Dutch estimate was that a library which lends 100,000 books per year should plan on a cost of €50,000 (borrow- and return-stations: 12,500 each, detection porches 10,000 each; tags 0.36 each). RFID taking a large burden off staff could also mean that fewer staff will be needed, resulting in some of them getting laid off, but that has so far not happened in North America where recent surveys have not returned a single library that cut staff because of adding RFID. In fact, library budgets are being reduced for personnel and increased for infrastructure, making it necessary for libraries to add automation to compensate for the reduced staff size. Also, the tasks that RFID takes over are largely not the primary tasks of librarians. A finding in the Netherlands is that borrowers are pleased with the fact that staff are now more available for answering questions.

Privacy concerns have been raised surrounding library use of RFID. Because some RFID tags can be read up to 100 metres (330 ft) away, there is some concern over whether sensitive information could be collected from an unwilling source. However, library RFID tags do not contain any patron information, and the tags used in the majority of libraries use a frequency only readable from approximately 10 feet (3.0 m). Another concern is that a non-library agency could potentially record the RFID tags of every person leaving the library without the library administrator's knowledge or consent. One simple option is to let the book transmit a code that has meaning only in conjunction with the library's database. Another possible enhancement would be to give each book a new code every time it is returned. In future, should readers become ubiquitous (and possibly networked), then stolen books could be traced even outside the library. Tag removal could be made difficult if the tags are so small that they fit invisibly inside a (random) page, possibly put there by the publisher.

==== Museums ====
RFID technologies are now also implemented in end-user applications in museums. An example was the custom-designed temporary research application, "eXspot", at the Exploratorium, a science museum in San Francisco, California. A visitor entering the museum received an RF tag that could be carried as a card. The eXspot system enabled the visitor to receive information about specific exhibits. Aside from the exhibit information, the visitor could take photographs of themselves at the exhibit. It was also intended to allow the visitor to take data for later analysis. The collected information could be retrieved at home from a "personalized" website keyed to the RFID tag.

==== Schools and universities ====
In 2004, school authorities in the Japanese city of Osaka made a decision to start chipping children's clothing, backpacks, and student IDs in a primary school. Later, in 2007, a school in Doncaster, England, piloted a monitoring system designed to keep tabs on pupils by tracking radio chips in their uniforms. St Charles Sixth Form College in west London, England, starting in 2008, uses an RFID card system to check in and out of the main gate, to both track attendance and prevent unauthorized entrance. Similarly, Whitcliffe Mount School in Cleckheaton, England, uses RFID to track pupils and staff in and out of the building via a specially designed card. In the Philippines, during 2012, some schools already use RFID in IDs for borrowing books. Gates in those particular schools also have RFID scanners for buying items at school shops and canteens. RFID is also used in school libraries, and to sign in and out for student and teacher attendance.

=== Sports ===
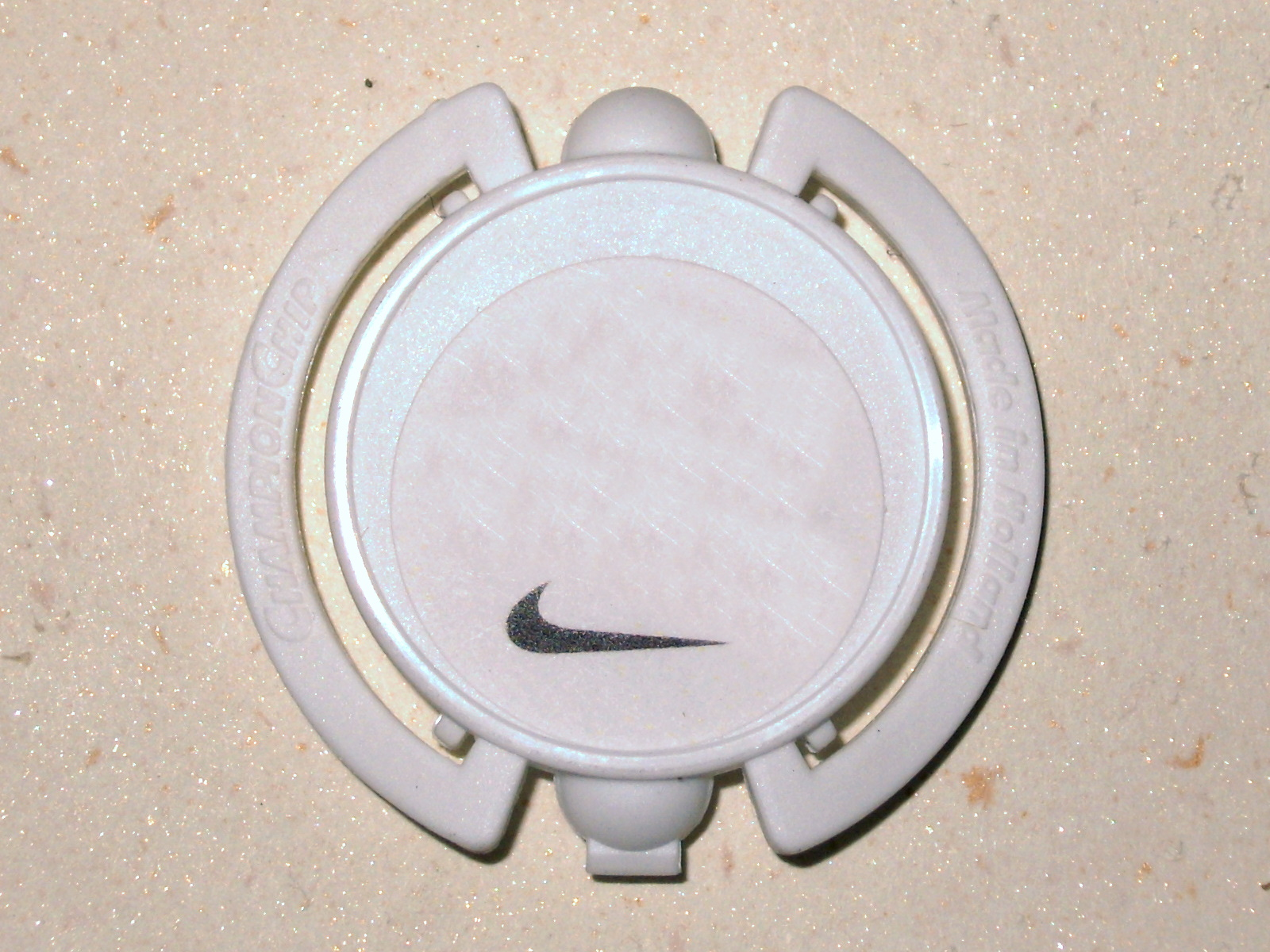
ChampionChip

RFID for timing races began in the early 1990s with pigeon racing, introduced by the company Deister Electronics in Germany. RFID can provide race start and end timings for individuals in large races where it is impossible to get accurate stopwatch readings for every entrant.

In races using RFID, racers wear tags that are read by antennas placed alongside the track or on mats across the track. UHF tags provide accurate readings with specially designed antennas. Rush error, lap count errors and accidents at race start are avoided, as anyone can start and finish at any time without being in a batch mode.

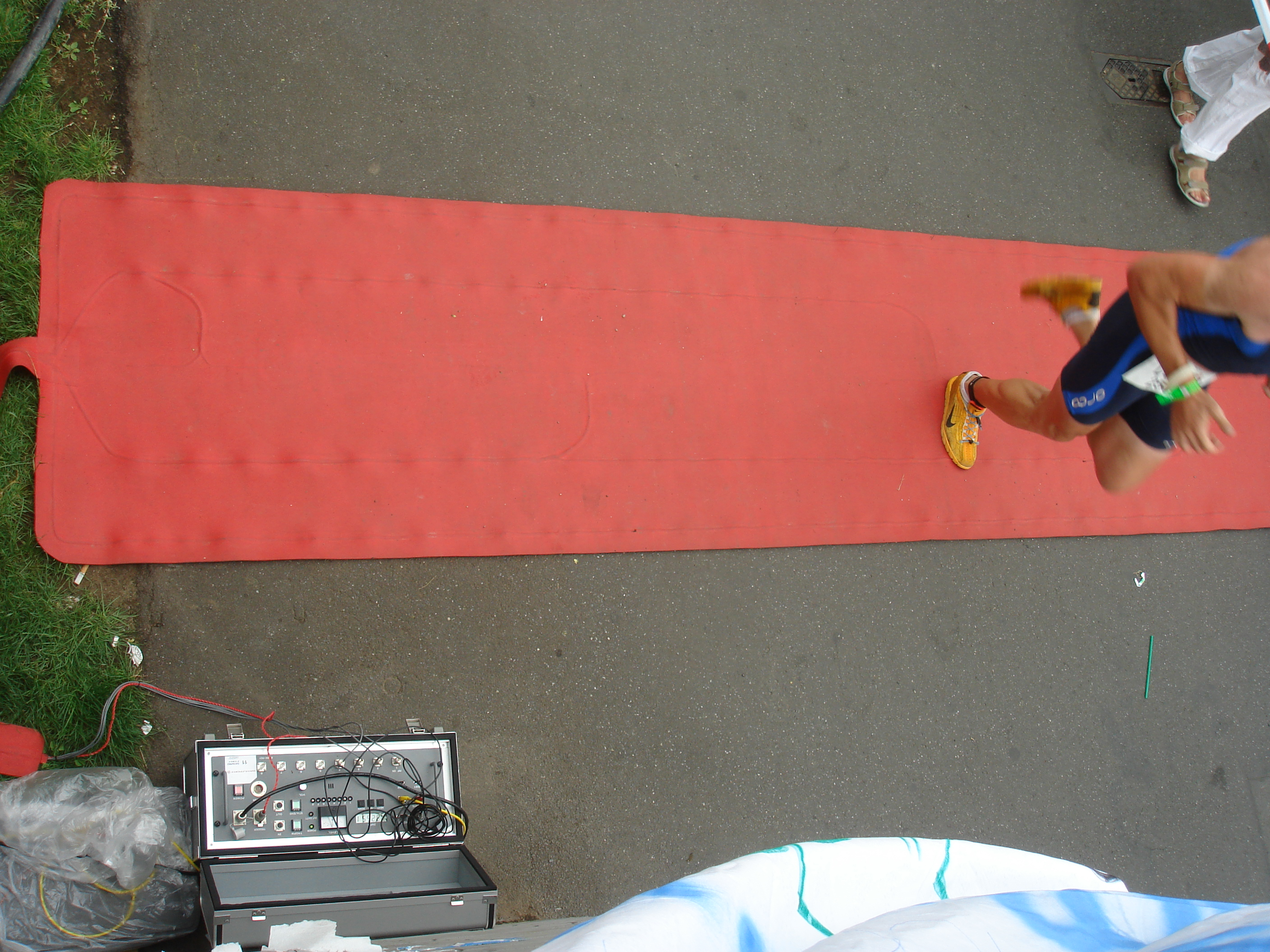
J-Chip 8-channel receiver next to timing mat. The athlete wears a chip on a strap around their ankle. Ironman Germany 2007 in Frankfurt.

The design of the chip and of the antenna controls the range from which it can be read. Short range compact chips are twist tied to the shoe, or strapped to the ankle with hook-and-loop fasteners. The chips must be about 400 mm from the mat, therefore giving very good temporal resolution. Alternatively, a chip plus a very large (125 mm square) antenna can be incorporated into the bib number worn on the athlete's chest at a height of about 1.25 m (4.1 ft).

Passive and active RFID systems are used in off-road events such as Orienteering, Enduro and Hare and Hounds racing. Riders have a transponder on their person, normally on their arm. When they complete a lap they swipe or touch the receiver which is connected to a computer and log their lap time.

RFID is being adapted by many recruitment agencies which have a PET (physical endurance test) as their qualifying procedure, especially in cases where the candidate volumes may run into millions (Indian Railway recruitment cells, police and power sector).

A number of ski resorts have adopted RFID tags to provide skiers hands-free access to ski lifts. Skiers do not have to take their passes out of their pockets. Ski jackets have a left pocket into which the chip+card fits. This nearly contacts the sensor unit on the left of the turnstile as the skier pushes through to the lift. These systems were based on high frequency (HF) at 13.56 MHz. The bulk of ski areas in Europe, from Verbier to Chamonix, use these systems.

The NFL in the United States equips players with RFID chips that measures speed, distance and direction traveled by each player in real-time. Currently, cameras stay focused on the quarterback; however, numerous plays are happening simultaneously on the field. The RFID chip will provide new insight into these simultaneous plays. The chip triangulates the player's position within six inches and will be used to digitally broadcast replays. The RFID chip will make individual player information accessible to the public. The data will be available via the NFL 2015 app. The RFID chips are manufactured by Zebra Technologies. Zebra Technologies tested the RFID chip in 18 stadiums last year to track vector data.

=== Complement to barcode ===
RFID tags are not necessarily "superior" to barcodes. RFID tags are often a complement, but not a substitute, for Universal Product Code (UPC) or European Article Number (EAN) barcodes. They may never completely replace barcodes, due in part to their higher cost and the advantage of multiple data sources on the same object. Also, unlike RFID labels, barcodes can be generated and distributed electronically by e-mail or mobile phone, for printing or display by the recipient. An example is airline boarding passes. The new EPC, along with several other schemes, is widely available at reasonable cost.

The storage of data associated with tracking items will require many terabytes. Filtering and categorizing RFID data is needed to create useful information. It is likely that goods will be tracked by the pallet using RFID tags, and at package level with UPC or EAN from unique barcodes.

The unique identity is a mandatory requirement for RFID tags, despite special choice of the numbering scheme. RFID tag data capacity is large enough that each individual tag will have a unique code, while current barcodes are limited to a single type code for a particular product. The uniqueness of RFID tags means that a product may be tracked as it moves from location to location while being delivered to a person. This may help to combat theft and other forms of product loss. The tracing of products is an important feature that is well supported with RFID tags containing a unique identity of the tag and the serial number of the object. This may help companies cope with quality deficiencies and resulting recall campaigns, but also contributes to concern about tracking and profiling of persons after the sale.

=== Waste management ===
Since around 2007, there has been increasing development in the use of RFID in the waste management industry. RFID tags are installed on waste collection carts, linking carts to the owner's account for easy billing and service verification. The tag is embedded into a garbage and recycle container, and the RFID reader is affixed to the garbage and recycle trucks. RFID also measures a customer's set-out rate and provides insight as to the number of carts serviced by each waste collection vehicle. This RFID process replaces traditional "pay as you throw" (PAYT) municipal solid waste usage-pricing models.

=== Telemetry ===
Active RFID tags have the potential to function as low-cost remote sensors that broadcast telemetry back to a base station. Applications of tagometry data could include sensing of road conditions by implanted beacons, weather reports, and noise level monitoring.

Passive RFID tags can also report sensor data. For example, the Wireless Identification and Sensing Platform is a passive tag that reports temperature, acceleration and capacitance to commercial Gen2 RFID readers.

It is possible that active or battery-assisted passive (BAP) RFID tags could broadcast a signal to an in-store receiver to determine whether the RFID tag – and by extension, the product it is attached to – is in the store.

== Regulation and standardization ==
To avoid injuries to humans and animals, RF transmission needs to be controlled. A number of organizations have set standards for RFID, including the International Organization for Standardization (ISO), the International Electrotechnical Commission (IEC), ASTM International, the DASH7 Alliance and EPCglobal.

Several specific industries have also set guidelines, including the Financial Services Technology Consortium (FSTC) for tracking IT Assets with RFID, the Computer Technology Industry Association CompTIA for certifying RFID engineers, and the International Air Transport Association (IATA) for luggage in airports.

Every country can set its own rules for frequency allocation for RFID tags, and not all radio bands are available in all countries. These frequencies are known as the ISM bands (Industrial Scientific and Medical bands). The return signal of the tag may still cause interference for other radio users.

- Low-frequency (LF: 125–134.2 kHz and 140–148.5 kHz) (LowFID) tags and high-frequency (HF: 13.56 MHz) (HighFID) tags can be used globally without a license.
- Ultra-high-frequency (UHF: 865–928 MHz) (Ultra-HighFID or UHFID) tags cannot be used globally as there is no single global standard, and regulations differ from country to country.

In North America, UHF can be used unlicensed for 902–928 MHz (±13 MHz from the 915 MHz center frequency), but restrictions exist for transmission power. In Europe, RFID and other low-power radio applications are regulated by ETSI recommendations EN 300 220 and EN 302 208, and ERO recommendation 70 03, allowing RFID operation with somewhat complex band restrictions from 865–868 MHz. Readers are required to monitor a channel before transmitting ("Listen Before Talk"); this requirement has led to some restrictions on performance, the resolution of which is a subject of current research. The North American UHF standard is not accepted in France as it interferes with its military bands. On July 25, 2012, Japan changed its UHF band to 920 MHz, more closely matching the United States' 915 MHz band, establishing an international standard environment for RFID.

In some countries, a site license is needed, which needs to be applied for at the local authorities, and can be revoked.

As of 31 October 2014, regulations are in place in 78 countries representing approximately 96.5% of the world's GDP, and work on regulations was in progress in three countries representing approximately 1% of the world's GDP.

Standards that have been made regarding RFID include:

- ISO 11784/11785 – Animal identification. Uses 134.2 kHz.
- ISO 14223 – Radiofrequency identification of animals – Advanced transponders
- ISO/IEC 14443: This standard is a popular HF (13.56 MHz) standard for HighFIDs which is being used as the basis of RFID-enabled passports under ICAO 9303. The Near Field Communication standard that lets mobile devices act as RFID readers/transponders is also based on ISO/IEC 14443.
- ISO/IEC 15693: This is also a popular HF (13.56 MHz) standard for HighFIDs widely used for non-contact smart payment and credit cards.
- ISO/IEC 18000: Information technology—Radio frequency identification for item management:
- ISO/IEC 18092 Information technology—Telecommunications and information exchange between systems—Near Field Communication—Interface and Protocol (NFCIP-1)
- ISO 18185: This is the industry standard for electronic seals or "e-seals" for tracking cargo containers using the 433 MHz and 2.4 GHz frequencies.
- ISO/IEC 21481 Information technology—Telecommunications and information exchange between systems—Near Field Communication Interface and Protocol −2 (NFCIP-2)
- ASTM D7434, Standard Test Method for Determining the Performance of Passive Radio Frequency Identification (RFID) Transponders on Palletized or Unitized Loads
- ASTM D7435, Standard Test Method for Determining the Performance of Passive Radio Frequency Identification (RFID) Transponders on Loaded Containers
- ASTM D7580, Standard Test Method for Rotary Stretch Wrapper Method for Determining the Readability of Passive RFID Transponders on Homogenous Palletized or Unitized Loads
- ISO 28560-2— specifies encoding standards and data model to be used within libraries.

In order to ensure global interoperability of products, several organizations have set up additional standards for RFID testing. These standards include conformance, performance and interoperability tests.

=== EPC Gen2 ===
EPC Gen2 is short for EPCglobal UHF Class 1 Generation 2.

EPCglobal, a joint venture between GS1 and GS1 US, is working on international standards for the use of mostly passive RFID and the Electronic Product Code (EPC) in the identification of many items in the supply chain for companies worldwide.

One of the missions of EPCglobal was to simplify the Babel of protocols prevalent in the RFID world in the 1990s. Two tag air interfaces (the protocol for exchanging information between a tag and a reader) were defined (but not ratified) by EPCglobal prior to 2003. These protocols, commonly known as Class 0 and Class 1, saw significant commercial implementation in 2002–2005.

In 2004, the Hardware Action Group created a new protocol, the Class 1 Generation 2 interface, which addressed a number of problems that had been experienced with Class 0 and Class 1 tags. The EPC Gen2 standard was approved in December 2004. This was approved after a contention from Intermec that the standard may infringe a number of their RFID-related patents. It was decided that the standard itself does not infringe their patents, making the standard royalty free. The EPC Gen2 standard was adopted with minor modifications as ISO 18000-6C in 2006.

The updated Class 1 Generation 2 version 3.0 standard was ratified in January 2024. The new standard includes a longer power-up period (2500 microseconds instead of 1500), and the option to reduce power slightly during a command, in order to reduce the chances of partial responses from tags at the edge of the read zone. New commands QueryX and QueryY, combining Select and Query, have been added, in addition to various other minor changes and additions.

In 2007, the lowest cost of Gen2 EPC inlay was offered by the now-defunct company SmartCode, at a price of $0.05 apiece in volumes of 100 million or more.

== Problems and concerns ==
=== RFID tags’ environmental footprint, e‑waste status, and privacy ===
Large-scale RFID deployment has prompted discussion of the environmental footprint and end-of-life status of RFID tags themselves, since common “label/inlay” tags are micro-electronic devices (a silicon IC connected to an antenna and incorporated into packaging materials) that are often embedded into everyday goods such as apparel and consumer packaging. Industry shipment data highlight the scale: the RAIN Alliance reported 44.8 billion RAIN UHF tag IC shipments in 2023, and (citing a VDC Research forecast commissioned by the RAIN Alliance) reported a projection of 88.5 billion shipments by 2026; a later RAIN/VDC report described a pathway toward 115 billion by 2028 and discussed longer-term trillion-scale opportunities as use cases expand.

Life-cycle studies report that per-tag climate impacts can vary with tag design and system boundaries. Nguyen & Perret (IEEE JRFID, 2024) report tag-level global-warming results comparing a chip-based UHF RFID inlay, a chipless RFID tag, and a barcode label (e.g., UHF RFID 0.336 kg CO2-eq; chipless RFID 0.148 kg CO2-eq; barcode 0.0269 kg CO2-eq; chip incremental ≈0.222 kg CO2-eq from a “tag without chip” scenario), while other LCAs (e.g., Aliakbarian et al., 2024; Zhang et al., 2025) illustrate sensitivity to constructions, assumptions, and end-of-life scenarios.

Under EU law, RoHS 2011/65/EU defines electrical and electronic equipment (EEE) as equipment dependent on electric currents or electromagnetic fields to work properly, while WEEE 2012/19/EU defines waste electrical and electronic equipment (WEEE) as discarded EEE including “all components, sub-assemblies and consumables” present at discarding; Eurostat repeats these definitions for WEEE monitoring. In the United States, e-waste regulation is comparatively fragmented: the EPA notes that 25 states plus the District of Columbia have electronics recycling laws.

End-of-life studies emphasize practical constraints: the EU-funded SMART TRASH study notes that waste processing facilities are generally not designed to separate RFID chips (except possibly in dedicated streams such as WEEE) and highlights contamination concerns; a packaging end-of-life assessment reports that tag particulates can be transferred into recyclate; and one supply-chain LCA states that RFID tags attached to milk cartons typically end up in landfills as electronic waste because consumers discard cartons with tags attached.

Mitigation approaches discussed in the literature include eco-design, take-back/reuse schemes, and substitution with chipless RFID where feasible (tags “not equipped with” an ASIC), though chipless approaches have technical performance trade-offs and infrastructure constraints. If future policy or enforcement interpreted embedded tags as bringing otherwise non-electronic goods within WEEE scope, producer responsibility requirements for collection, reporting and financing of end-of-life treatment could expand, increasing compliance costs and strengthening incentives for reusable tags, removable identifiers, or chipless/printed alternatives.

Separate from environmental issues, RFID has long raised privacy concerns because tags can be read without line-of-sight at distances of meters depending on frequency and tag type, enabling unauthorized reading and potential tracking/profiling; an ACM review highlights covert reading of personal items and the possibility of tracking consumers’ spending patterns and whereabouts, and the European Commission issued a recommendation on implementing privacy and data-protection principles in RFID applications. Research using RFID readers and tag detections has also been used to derive “co-presence” networks (co-location inferred from which readers detect which tags), illustrating how RFID-derived co-location patterns can be analyzed.

=== Data flooding ===
Not every successful reading of a tag (an observation) is useful for business purposes. A large amount of data may be generated that is not useful for managing inventory or other applications. For example, a customer moving a product from one shelf to another, or a pallet load of articles that passes several readers while being moved in a warehouse, are events that do not produce data that are meaningful to an inventory control system.

Event filtering is required to reduce this data inflow to a meaningful depiction of moving goods passing a threshold. Various concepts have been designed, mainly offered as middleware performing the filtering from noisy and redundant raw data to significant processed data.

=== Global standardization ===
The frequencies used for UHF RFID in the USA are as of 2007 incompatible with those of Europe or Japan. Furthermore, no emerging standard has yet become as universal as the barcode. To address international trade concerns, it is necessary to use a tag that is operational within all of the international frequency domains.

=== Security concerns ===
A primary RFID security concern is the illicit tracking of RFID tags. Tags, which are world-readable, pose a risk to both personal location privacy and corporate/military security. Such concerns have been raised with respect to the United States Department of Defense's adoption of RFID tags for supply chain management. More generally, privacy organizations have expressed concerns in the context of ongoing efforts to embed electronic product code (EPC) RFID tags in general-use products. This is mostly as a result of the fact that RFID tags can be read, and legitimate transactions with readers can be eavesdropped on, from non-trivial distances. RFID used in access control, payment and eID (e-passport) systems operate at a shorter range than EPC RFID systems but are also vulnerable to skimming and eavesdropping, albeit at shorter distances.

A second method of prevention is by using cryptography. Rolling codes and challenge–response authentication (CRA) are commonly used to foil monitor-repetition of the messages between the tag and reader, as any messages that have been recorded would prove to be unsuccessful on repeat transmission. Rolling codes rely upon the tag's ID being changed after each interrogation, while CRA uses software to ask for a cryptographically coded response from the tag. The protocols used during CRA can be symmetric, or may use public key cryptography.

While a variety of secure protocols have been suggested for RFID tags, in order to support long read range at low cost, many RFID tags have barely enough power available to support very low-power and therefore simple security protocols such as cover-coding.

Unauthorized reading of RFID tags presents a risk to privacy and to business secrecy. Unauthorized readers can potentially use RFID information to identify or track packages, persons, carriers, or the contents of a package. Several prototype systems are being developed to combat unauthorized reading, including RFID signal interruption, as well as the possibility of legislation, and 700 scientific papers have been published on this matter since 2002. There are also concerns that the database structure of Object Naming Service may be susceptible to infiltration, similar to denial-of-service attacks, after the EPCglobal Network ONS root servers were shown to be vulnerable.

=== Health ===
Tumors induced by implanted microchips have been noted during animal trials.

=== Shielding ===
In an effort to prevent the passive "skimming" of RFID-enabled cards or passports, the U.S. General Services Administration (GSA) issued a set of test procedures for evaluating electromagnetically opaque sleeves. For shielding products to be in compliance with FIPS-201 guidelines, they must meet or exceed this published standard; compliant products are listed on the website of the U.S. CIO's FIPS-201 Evaluation Program. The United States government requires that when new ID cards are issued, they must be delivered with an approved shielding sleeve or holder. Although many wallets and passport holders are advertised to protect personal information, there is little evidence that RFID skimming is a serious threat; data encryption and use of EMV chips rather than RFID makes this sort of theft rare.

There are contradictory opinions as to whether aluminum can prevent reading of RFID chips. Some people claim that aluminum shielding, essentially creating a Faraday cage, does work. Others claim that simply wrapping an RFID card in aluminum foil only makes transmission more difficult and is not completely effective at preventing it.

Shielding effectiveness depends on the frequency being used. Low-frequency LowFID tags, like those used in implantable devices for humans and pets, are relatively resistant to shielding, although thick metal foil will prevent most reads. High frequency HighFID tags (13.56 MHz—smart cards and access badges) are sensitive to shielding and are difficult to read when within a few centimetres of a metal surface. UHF Ultra-HighFID tags (pallets and cartons) are difficult to read when placed within a few millimetres of a metal surface, although their read range is actually increased when they are spaced 2–4 cm from a metal surface due to positive reinforcement of the reflected wave and the incident wave at the tag.

Logo of the anti-RFID campaign by German privacy group digitalcourage (formerly FoeBuD)

=== Privacy ===
The use of RFID has engendered considerable controversy and some consumer privacy advocates have initiated product boycotts. Consumer privacy experts Katherine Albrecht and Liz McIntyre are two prominent critics of the "spychip" technology. The two main privacy concerns regarding RFID are as follows:

- As the owner of an item may not necessarily be aware of the presence of an RFID tag and the tag can be read at a distance without the knowledge of the individual, sensitive data may be acquired without consent.
- If a tagged item is paid for by credit card or in conjunction with use of a loyalty card, then it would be possible to indirectly deduce the identity of the purchaser by reading the globally unique ID of that item contained in the RFID tag. This is a possibility if the person watching also had access to the loyalty card and credit card data, and the person with the equipment knows where the purchaser is going to be.

Most concerns revolve around the fact that RFID tags affixed to products remain functional even after the products have been purchased and taken home; thus, they may be used for surveillance and other purposes unrelated to their supply chain inventory functions.

The RFID Network responded to these fears in the first episode of their syndicated cable TV series, saying that they are unfounded, and let RF engineers demonstrate how RFID works. They provided images of RF engineers driving an RFID-enabled van around a building and trying to take an inventory of items inside. They also discussed satellite tracking of a passive RFID tag.

The concerns raised may be addressed in part by use of the Clipped Tag. The Clipped Tag is an RFID tag designed to increase privacy for the purchaser of an item. The Clipped Tag has been suggested by IBM researchers Paul Moskowitz and Guenter Karjoth. After the point of sale, a person may tear off a portion of the tag. This allows the transformation of a long-range tag into a proximity tag that still may be read, but only at short range – less than a few inches or centimeters. The modification of the tag may be confirmed visually. The tag may still be used later for returns, recalls, or recycling.

However, read range is a function of both the reader and the tag itself. Improvements in technology may increase read ranges for tags. Tags may be read at longer ranges than they are designed for by increasing reader power. The limit on read distance then becomes the signal-to-noise ratio of the signal reflected from the tag back to the reader. Researchers at two security conferences have demonstrated that passive Ultra-HighFID tags normally read at ranges of up to 30 feet can be read at ranges of 50 to 69 feet using suitable equipment.

In January 2004, privacy advocates from CASPIAN and the German privacy group FoeBuD were invited to the METRO Future Store in Germany, where an RFID pilot project was implemented. It was uncovered by accident that METRO "Payback" customer loyalty cards contained RFID tags with customer IDs, a fact that was disclosed neither to customers receiving the cards, nor to this group of privacy advocates. This happened despite assurances by METRO that no customer identification data was tracked and all RFID usage was clearly disclosed.

During the UN World Summit on the Information Society (WSIS) in November 2005, Richard Stallman, the founder of the free software movement, protested the use of RFID security cards by covering his card with aluminum foil.

In 2004–2005, the Federal Trade Commission staff conducted a workshop and review of RFID privacy concerns and issued a report recommending best practices.

RFID was one of the main topics of the 2006 Chaos Communication Congress (organized by the Chaos Computer Club in Berlin) and triggered a large press debate. Topics included electronic passports, MIFARE cryptography and the tickets for the FIFA World Cup 2006. Talks showed how the first real-world mass application of RFID at the 2006 FIFA Football World Cup worked. The group monochrom staged a "Hack RFID" song.

=== Government control ===
Some individuals have grown to fear the loss of rights due to RFID human implantation.

By early 2007, Chris Paget of San Francisco, California, showed that RFID information could be pulled from a US passport card by using only $250 worth of equipment. This suggests that with the information captured, it would be possible to clone such cards.

According to ZDNet, critics believe that RFID will lead to tracking individuals' every movement and will be an invasion of privacy. In the book SpyChips: How Major Corporations and Government Plan to Track Your Every Move by Katherine Albrecht and Liz McIntyre, one is encouraged to "imagine a world of no privacy. Where your every purchase is monitored and recorded in a database and your every belonging is numbered. Where someone many states away or perhaps in another country has a record of everything you have ever bought. What's more, they can be tracked and monitored remotely".

=== Deliberate destruction in clothing and other items ===
According to an RSA laboratories FAQ, RFID tags can be destroyed by a standard microwave oven; however, some types of RFID tags, particularly those constructed to radiate using large metallic antennas (in particular RF tags and EPC tags), may catch fire if subjected to this process for too long (as would any metallic item inside a microwave oven). This simple method cannot safely be used to deactivate RFID features in electronic devices, or those implanted in living tissue, because of the risk of damage to the "host". However the time required is extremely short (a second or two of radiation) and the method works in many other non-electronic and inanimate items, long before heat or fire become of concern.

Some RFID tags implement a "kill command" mechanism to permanently and irreversibly disable them. This mechanism can be applied if the chip itself is trusted or the mechanism is known by the person that wants to "kill" the tag.

UHF RFID tags that comply with the EPC2 Gen 2 Class 1 standard usually support this mechanism, while protecting the chip from being killed with a password. Guessing or cracking this needed 32-bit password for killing a tag would not be difficult for a determined attacker.

== See also ==
- Balise
- Bin bug
- Campus card
- Chipless RFID
- FASTag
- Internet of Things
- Mass surveillance
- Microchip implant (human)
- Mobile RFID
- Near-field communication (NFC)
- PositiveID
- Privacy by design
- Proximity card
- Resonant inductive coupling
- RFdump
- RFID in schools
- RFID Journal
- RFID on metal
- RSA blocker tag
- Smart label
- Speedpass
- Tageos
- TecTile
- Tracking system
