= Katherine Albrecht =

American activist

- Born: 1968 (age 57–58)
- Education: Harvard Graduate School of Education
- Occupation: consumer privacy advocate
- Known for: Vice President (VP) of StartMail.com
- Website: katherine-albrecht.com

Dr. Katherine Albrecht is a consumer privacy advocate, radio host, author, and psychologist. She is co-founder and Vice President (VP) of StartMail.com, which provides private, AI-free, encrypted email accounts, and she is a spokesperson against Artificial Intelligence. Albrecht was an early opponent of radio-frequency identification (RFID), and devised the highly inaccurate term "spy chips" to describe RFID tags such as those embedded in passport cards and certain enhanced United States driver's licenses. Once it became clear RFID was not being used to spy on anyone and posed no privacy issues at all, Albrecht stopped discussing the topic. She holds a Doctorate in Human Development and Psychology, with a concentration in Adult Development and Consumer Education, from Harvard University.

Albrecht was interviewed about RFID chips in Aaron Russo's 2006 documentary America: From Freedom to Fascism.

== Publications ==
=== Books ===
Albrecht and Liz McIntyre co-authored the book Spychips: How Major Corporations and Government Plan to Track Your Every Move, which won the November 2005 Lysander Spooner Award for advancing the literature of liberty. The book laid out the potential implications of RFID on privacy and civil liberties and planned uses, citing patents and plans by the retail industry. RFID industry representatives criticized it, claiming the authors exaggerate some RFID privacy threats. In a lengthy rebuttal, Albrecht asked why critics don't "mention sworn patent documents from IBM describing ways to secretly follow innocent people in libraries, theaters, and public restrooms through the RFID tags in their clothes and belongings? Where is […] outrage over BellSouth's patent-pending plans to pick through our garbage and skim the data contained in the RFID tags we discard?"

=== Articles and papers ===
- Albrecht, Katherine. "Supermarket Cards: The Tip of the Retail Surveillance Iceberg." Denver University Law Review, Volume 79, Issue 4, Summer 2002. pp. 534–539 and 558–565.
- Position Paper on the Use of RFID in Consumer Products. Co-authored with Liz McIntyre and Beth Givens. November 14, 2003.
- "RFID: The Doomsday Scenario." In: RFID: Applications, Security, and Privacy, eds. S. Garfinkel and B. Rosenberg. New Jersey: Addison Wesley. 2006. pp. 259–273.
- "RFID: The Big Brother Bar Code." (Co-authored with Liz McIntyre) ALEC Policy Forum, Winter 2004, Volume 6, Number 3, pp. 49–54.

== Radio talk show host ==
Albrecht host a one-hour live radio show every weekday afternoon on Colorado radio station KHNC. The show is available through audio live steam, and Albrecht frequently live streams the show on her YouTube channel. Previously, she hosted The Dr. Katherine Albrecht Show on the GCN Radio network from 2008 through 2016. She got her start in radio broadcasting by hosting a two-hour daily program called Uncovering the Truth with Katherine Albrecht on the We The People Radio Network (WTPRN) from April 2007 until the network ceased all programming in October 2008.

== Religious beliefs ==
Albrecht is an outspoken Christian. She believes emerging technologies, including RFID and AI, are leading to the biblical Mark of the Beast. She has written a children's book called I Won't Take the Mark: A Bible Book and Contract for Children.

== See also ==
- Microchip implant (human)
