= Chipless RFID =

Chipless RFID tags are RFID tags that do not require a microchip in the transponder.

RFIDs offer longer range and ability to be automated, unlike barcodes that require a human operator for interrogation. The main challenge to their adoption is the cost of RFIDs. The design and fabrication of ASICs needed for RFID are the major component of their cost, so removing ICs altogether can significantly reduce its cost. The major challenges in designing chipless RFID is data encoding and transmission.

== Development of chipless RFID tags ==
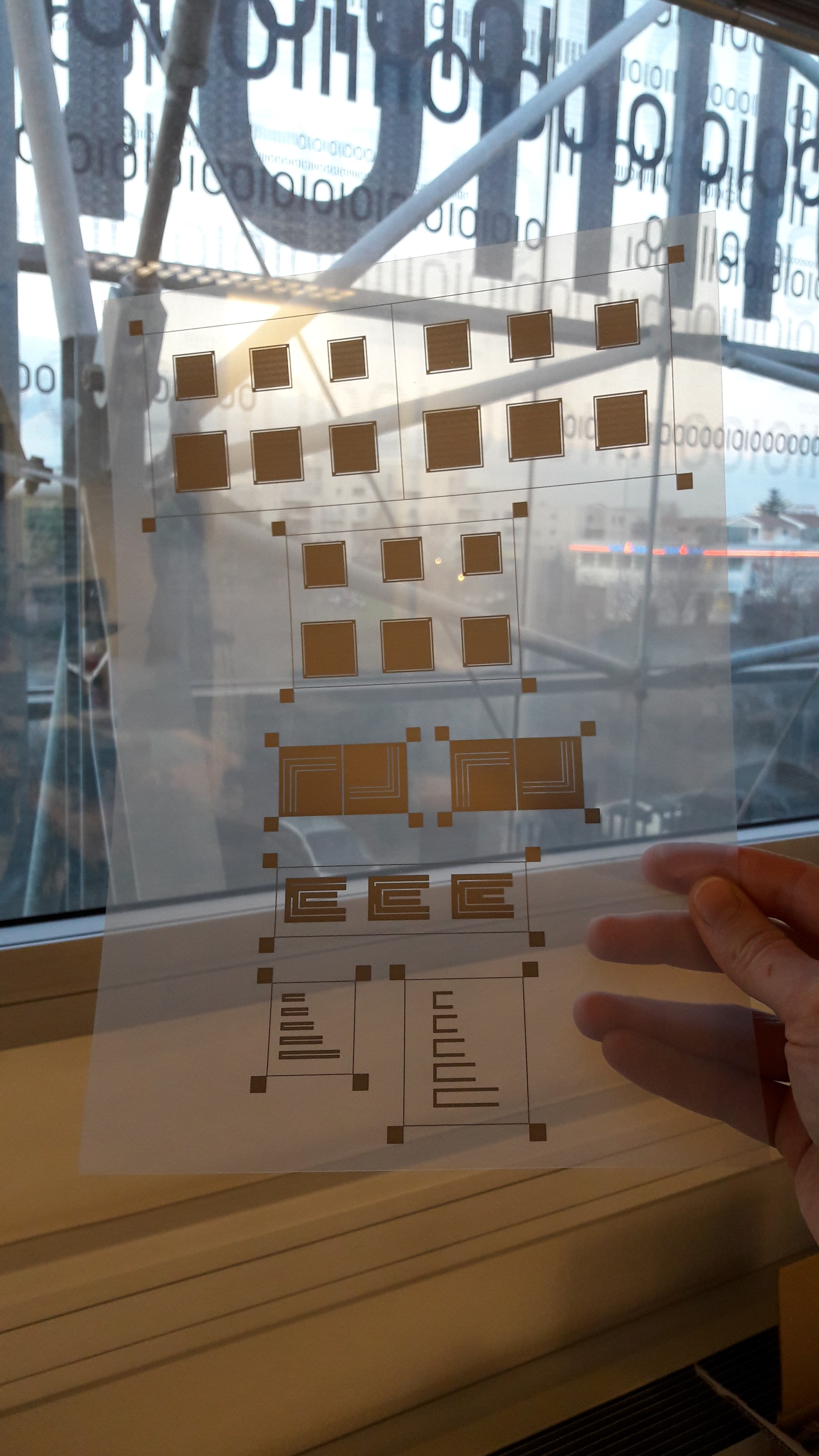
Chipless tag printed with inkjet printing conductive ink.

In comparison to classic RFID and barcodes, RFID benefits from a spectrum of functionalities, related to the use of radio-frequency (RF) waves for data exchange. The acquisition of the identifier (ID) is made easier and volumetric readings are made possible, all on tags containing modifiable information. These functions are impossible to implement with a barcode, but in reality, 70% of the items manufactured worldwide are equipped with it, as the label and the reader are relatively cheap.

It is also true that RFID contributes other significant functionalities, and the question is therefore one of imagining a technology based on RF waves as a communication vector that would retain some of the advantages of barcodes. Pragmatically speaking, the question of system cost, and particularly of the tags that must be produced in large numbers, remains the central point. Due to the presence of electronic circuits, these tags have a non-negligible cost that is a very great deal higher than that of barcodes. It is logical therefore that a simple solution consists of producing chipless RF tags. The high cost of RFID tags is actually one of the principal reasons that chipped RFID is rare in the market for tags for widely distributed products, a market that numbers in the tens of thousands of billions of units sold per year. In this market, optic barcodes are very widely used.

However, technically speaking, chipped RFID offers significant advantages including increased reading distance and the ability to detect a target outside the field of vision, whatever its position. The concept of chipless RF label has been developed with the idea of competing with barcodes in certain areas of application. RFID has many arguments in its favor in terms of functionality, the only problem remaining being the price. The barcode offers no other feature than the ID recovery; however, the technology is time-tested, widespread, and extremely low cost.

Chipless RFID also offers strong functional advantages, especially in cost, durability, and printability. Some functionalities are degraded versions of what RFID can do (read range / reading flexibility are reduced ...), others seem to be even more relevant in chipless (discretion, product integrity of the tag). The main advantage is the cost of chipless tags. As compared to the barcodes, the chipless technology must bring other features that are impossible to implement with the optical approach, while remaining a very low cost approach, that is to say, a potentially printable one. This is why the writing / rewriting and sensor capabilities are crucial features for the large-scale development of such a technology. For instance, the development of very low cost sensor - tags is now eagerly awaited for, for application reasons.

== Operating principle ==
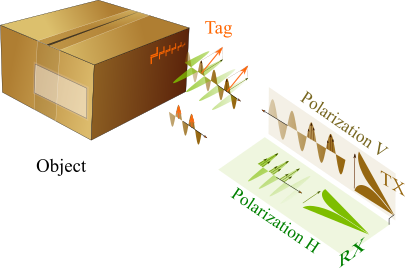
Chipless rfid operating principle. A. Vena, E. Perret, and S. Tedjini, 2013.

Like various existing RFID technologies, chipless RFID tags are associated with a specific RF reader, which questions the tag and recovers the information contained in it. The operating principle of the reader is based on the emission of a specific electromagnetic (EM) signal toward the tag, and the capture of the signal reflected by the tag. The processing of the signal received—notably via a decoding stage—makes it possible to recover the information contained in the tag.

However, chipless RFID tags are fundamentally different from RFID tags. In the latter, a specific frame is sent by the reader toward the tag according to a classic binary modulation schema. The tag demodulates this signal, processes the request, possibly writes data in its memory, and sends back a response, modulating its load. Chipless RFID tags, on the other hand, function without a communication protocol. They employ a grid of dipole antennas that are tuned to different frequencies. The interrogator generates a frequency sweep signal and scans for signal dips. Each dipole antenna can encode one bit. The frequency swept will be determined by the antenna length. They can be viewed as radar targets possessing a specific, stationary temporal or frequential signature. With this technology, the remote reading of an identifier consists of analyzing the radar signature of the tag.

Currently, one of main challenges of the chipless technology is the robustness of tag detection in different environments. It is useless to try to increase the quantity of information that a chipless tag can have if the tag ID cannot be read properly in real environments and without complex calibration techniques. The detection of a chipless tag in noisy environments is much more difficult in chipless than in UHF RFID due to the absence of modulation in time, that is, the absence of two different states in the backscattering signal.

=== AI-enabled chipless RFID readers ===
One of the key technical challenges in chipless RFID systems is maintaining reliable tag detection when tags are placed on different materials, curved or lossy surfaces, or under varying orientations and distances. These factors cause distortions in the backscattered radar cross section (RCS) signal, making conventional decoding methods less effective. Recent research has investigated the use of artificial intelligence to enhance tag readability and robustness under such variations. Rather et al. have demonstrated that deep learning models, including one-dimensional convolutional neural networks (1D-CNN) and hybrid deep convolutional neural network (DCNN) architectures, can significantly improve tag detection accuracy across diverse environments and tag deformations.

=== Chemical-based ===
==== Self-generating ceramic mixtures ====
In 2001, Roke Manor Research centre announced materials that emit characteristic radiation when moved. These may be exploited for storage of a few data bits encoded in the presence or absence of certain chemicals.

=== Biocompatible ink ===
Somark employed a dielectric barcode that may be read using microwaves. The dielectric material reflects, transmits and scatters the incident radiation; the different position and orientation of these bars affects the incident radiation differently and thus encodes the spatial arrangement in the reflected wave. The dielectric material may be dispersed in a fluid to create a dielectric ink. They were mainly used as tags for cattle, which were "painted" using a special needle. The ink may be visible or invisible according to the nature of the dielectric, Operating frequency of the tag may be changed by using different dielectrics.

==== CrossID nanometric ink ====
This system uses varying magnetism. Materials resonate at different frequencies when excited by radiation. The reader analyzes the spectrum of the reflected signal to identify the materials. 70 different materials were found. Each material's presence or absence may be used to encode a bit, enabling encoding up to 2^{70} unique binary strings. They work on frequencies between three and ten gigahertz.

=== Passive antenna ===
In 2004, Tapemark announced a chipless RFID that will have only a passive antenna with a diameter as small as 5 μm. The antenna consists of small fibers called nano-resonant structures. Spatial difference in structure encode data. The interrogator sends out a coherent pulse and reads back an interference pattern that it decodes to identify a tag. They work from 24 GHz–60 GHz. Tapemark later discontinued this technology.

=== Magnetism-based ===
==== Programmable magnetic resonance ====
Sagentia's devices are acousto-magnetic. They exploit the resonance features of magnetically soft magnetostrictive materials and the data retention capability of hard magnetic materials. Data is written to the card using the contact method. The resonance of the magnetostrictive material is altered by the data stored in the hard material. Harmonics may be enabled or disabled corresponding to the state of the hard material, thus encoding the device state as a spectral signature. Tags built by Sagentia for AstraZeneca fall into this category.

=== Magnetic data tagging ===
Flying Null technology uses a series of passive magnetic structures, much like the lines used in conventional barcodes. These structures are made of soft magnetic material. The interrogator contains two permanent magnets with like poles. The resulting magnetic field has a null volume in the centre. Additionally, interrogating radiation is used. The magnetic field created by the interrogator is such that it drives the soft material to saturation except when it is at the null volume. When in the null volume the soft magnet interacts with the interrogating radiation thus giving away the position of the soft material. Spatial resolution of more than 50 μm may be attained.

=== Surface acoustic wave ===
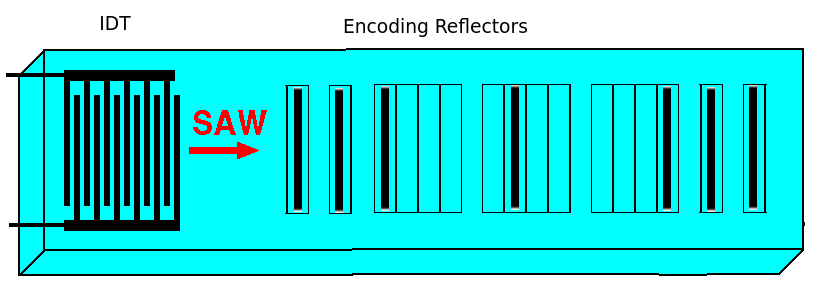
Illustration of a simple SAW RFID encoding 013 in base 4. The first and last reflectors are used for calibration. The second and second last for error detection. The data is encoded in the remaining three groups. Each group contains 4 slots and an empty slot followed by another group.

Surface acoustic wave devices consists of a piezoelectric crystal-like lithium niobate on which transducers are made by single-metal-layer photolithographic technology. The transducers usually are Inter-Digital Transducers (IDT), which have a two-toothed comb-like structure. An antenna is attached to the IDT for reception and transmission. The transducers convert the incident radio wave to surface acoustic waves that travel on the crystal surface until it reaches the encoding reflectors that reflect some waves and transmit the rest. The IDT collects the reflected waves and transmits them to the reader. The first and last reflectors are used for calibration as the response may be affected by physical parameters such as temperature. A pair of reflectors may also be used for error correction. The reflections increase in size from nearest to farthest of the IDT to account for losses due to preceding reflectors and wave attenuation. Data is encoded using Pulse Position Modulation (PPM). The crystal is logically divided into groups, such that each group typically has a length equal to the inverse of the bandwidth. Each group is divided into slots of equal width. The reflector may be placed in any slot. The last slot in each group is usually unused, leaving n-1 positions for the reflector, thus encoding n-1 states. The repetition rate of the PPM is equal to the system bandwidth. The reflector's slot position may be used to encode phase. The devices' temperature dependence means they can also act as temperature sensors.

=== Capacitively tuned split microstrip resonators ===
They employ a grid of dipole antennas that are tuned to different frequencies. The interrogator generates a frequency sweep signal and scans for signal dips. Each dipole antenna can encode one bit. The frequency swept will be determined by the antenna length.

== New trends ==
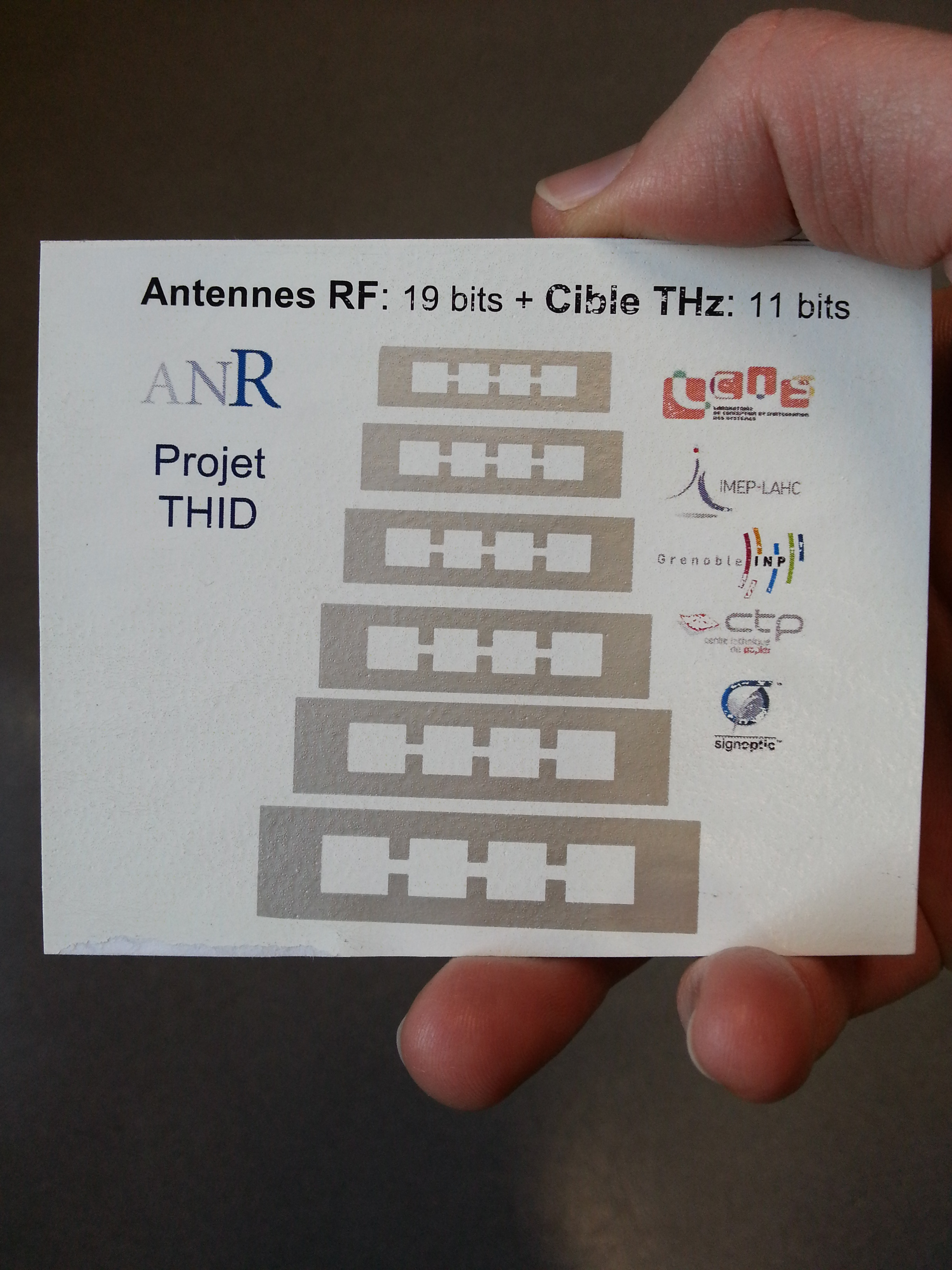
Paper chipless tag printed with flexography technique.

Many improvements have been done in the past few years on communication systems, based on electronic devices where an integrated circuit is at the heart of the whole system. The democratization of these chipped based systems like the RFID one have however given rise to environmental issues.

Lately, new research projects, such as European Research Council (ERC) funded project ScattererID, have introduced the paradigm of RF communication system based on chipless labels, where new useful functionalities can be added. With comparable costs to a barcode, these labels should stand out by providing more functionalities than the optical approach. The objective of ScattererID project is to show that it is possible to associate the chipless label ID with other features like the ability to write and rewrite the information, to associate an ID with a sensor function and to associate an ID with gesture recognition.

The possibility of designing reconfigurable and low cost tags involves the development of original approaches at the forefront of progress, like the use of CBRAM from microelectronics, allowing to achieve reconfigurable elements based on Nano-switches.

In addition to reconfigurable concepts, further advances have focused on increasing data density and integrating sensing functionality within a single chipless RFID tag. Rather et al. proposed a novel design methodology enabling high data encoding capacity of up to 18 bits within a compact tag size of approximately 4.8 cm, while simultaneously incorporating sensing capability on the same structure. The methodology employs depolarizing tag configurations and optimized resonator geometries to achieve high spectral efficiency and robust performance, representing one of the highest reported bit densities achieved in conjunction with sensing mechanisms operating within similar frequency bands.
