= Item-level tagging =

Item-level tagging (or RFID item-level tagging, also known as ILT) is the tagging of individual products, as opposed to case-level and pallet-level tagging. Item-level tagging is used to track individual items in order to better control inventory, by providing retailers with the ability to tag individual items on the retail floor. Previously, RFID tags were used to track pallets of merchandise, rather than individual items, through the supply chain. With the use of printed RFID tags, retailers are now able to track inventory at the item level, scan the tag, and know the location.

Retailers are pushing for tagging each individual item. In fact, large companies like Walmart, JCPenney, and Dillard's are issuing electronic product code mandates, where they request their suppliers to comply with these EPC protocols. In 2005, it was required that the suppliers use RFID tagging at the pallet and case level, but now it is required that they tag on the item-level as well. The reason why is it so important for them to implement this is because they want to avoid losing a sale over an out-of-stock item, which they believe accounts for a big part of their losses. Also, if they know where an item is at all times then it easier to move it to where it is supposed to be. By doing this they reduce transportation costs, they gain added shelf visibility and it drives down wasteful overstock.

== Benefits ==
Item-level tagging provides a quick, automated, cost efficient and accurate way to track inventory through the supply chain and in the retail environment. Benefits to item-level tagging include better visibility and control of inventory and an expansion of customer experience capabilities. Item-level tagging is critical in order to determine how much inventory is on the floor, what sizes and colors need to be restocked and what inventory is available in stock rooms. Other benefits include the ability to keep a fully stocked floor, increased time and labor savings, increase inventory accuracy, and reduction in clearance items due to incorrect inventory and excess ordering.

== Industries Using Item-Level Tagging ==
- Apparel
- Consumer goods
- Electronic goods
