= RFdump =

RFDump is a software created by Lukas Grunwald and Christian Bottger for security auditing RFID tags. It is periodically updated to support emerging RFID standards, such as e-passport and Mifare encryption, that are currently found on many pay-as-you-go systems.

RFDump is a back-end GPL tool that interoperates directly with any RFID reader to make the contents stored on RFID tags accessible. The tool reads an RFID tag's meta information: tag ID, tag type, manufacturer, etc. The user data of a tag can be displayed and modified using either a hex or an ASCII editor. The cookie feature demonstrates how simple it is to abuse RFID technology, such as companies using it to spy on consumers. RFDump works with the ACG Multi-Tag Reader or similar card reader hardware.

== RFDump features (Gtk application) ==
- Runs on Linux and Windows
- Supports ACGs PCMCIA/CF Multi-Tag Readers
- Decodes the tag type, tag ID, and manufacturer
- Displays tag memory in hex and ASCII encoding
- Allows to write memory using hex or ASCII editor
- Full ISO/IEC 14443 type A/B support
- Support for Mifare sector keys
- Cookie feature using arbitrary cookie ID and automatically incrementing counter
- Brute-force cracking of access control cards (sector keys)
- Audit of encrypted RFID tags to check for default shipping keys
- Save and restore Mifare cards including sector keys
- Multi baudrate reader support; RFDump can set baud rate
- Scan option
- Offers configuration menus for customized settings

=== Supported tag types ===
- ISO/IEC 15693: Tag-it ISO, My-d, I-Code SLI, LRI512, TempSense
- ISO/IEC 14443 type A: Mifare Standard(1,2), Mifare UltraLight(1,2)
- ISO/IEC 14443 type B: SR176(1,2)
- Tag-it
- I-Code
- EM4002
- EM4005
- EM4050
- HITAG1
- HITAG2
- Q5
- TIRIS
