= Tageos =

- Type: Private
- Industry: RFID, Sustainable Packaging
- Founded: 2007; 19 years ago
- Founders: Matthieu Picon, Laurent Delaby, Nicolas Jacquemin
- Headquarters: Montpellier, France
- Area served: Worldwide (North America, South America, Europe, APAC, Asia)
- Products: RFID inlays and tags (UHF, HF, NFC), Paper-based sustainable products, RFID sensors
- Number of employees: 450+
- Website: www.tageos.com

Tageos is a global company specializing in the design and manufacturing of RFID inlays and tags. The company is known for sustainable, paper-based products in the RFID industry. Tageos develops UHF RFID, HF, NFC, and BLE inlays and tags that help identify, verify, and track products and assets.

Tageos ranks among the three largest RFID inlay providers worldwide, producing 13 billion units annually that include RAIN RFID (UHF), NFC/HF, and BLE tags.

== History ==
Tageos was founded in 2007 by industry experts Matthieu Picon, Laurent Delaby and Nicolas Jacquemin. From its inception, Tageos has manufactured RFID labels that minimize the use of plastics and adhesives to reduce waste and minimize carbon footprint at a competitive price. Tageos is a member of their RFID Lab advisory board. In 2021, Tageos partnered with All4Labels, a global label company. All4Labels began supplying Tageos with precision laser-cut antennas made using 4E technology on FSC-certified paper. Also, Tageos introduced new products that use this antenna technology which features the latest integrated circuits (ICs) from Impinj and NXP.

In 2022, the Fedrigoni Group became the majority shareholder of Tageos. Fedrigoni is a global company specializing in high-quality papers for packaging, publishing, and graphics, as well as premium labels and self-adhesive materials. At the same year, Tageos introduced the EOS-350 M700 inlays, the smallest RFID inlays approved under ARC Spec U for airline and airport baggage tracking. This followed the earlier release of the smallest ARC Spec S and UnitVisID-approved inlays for healthcare and pharmaceutical use.

In 2023, new manufacturing sites in Fletcher, North Carolina, and Guangzhou, China, brought the company's total annual output to over 7 billion inlays. As of 2026, Tageos’ global manufacturing network, has a total annual production capacity of 13 billion units across locations in France, the United States, and China.

In 2025, Tageos launched its Innovation Center of Excellence (ICoE) to meet growing customer and market demand for new RFID, HF, NFC, and wireless Internet of Things (IoT) products. The ICoE expands the company’s research and development capabilities to include areas like advanced antennas, emerging technologies such as Bluetooth Low Energy (BLE), and the integration of flexible batteries, sensors, and other components.

== Products ==
- EOS Zero line features sustainable RFID inlays made from fully recyclable paper.
- Passive UHF RFID sensors that operate without batteries and can monitor environmental conditions such as temperature, light, and mechanical strain at distances of up to 10 meters (about 30 feet).
- HF and NFC inlays and tags designed for near field communication, compatible with common NFC readers that can be found in most smartphones for contactless payment applications.
