= Mobile RFID =

Mobile RFID (M-RFID) are services that provide information on objects equipped with an RFID tag over a telecommunication network. The reader or interrogator can be installed in a mobile device such as a mobile phone or PDA.

Unlike ordinary fixed RFID, mobile RFID readers are mobile, and the tags fixed, instead of the other way around. The advantages of M-RFID over RFID include the absence of wires to fixed readers and the ability of a small number of mobile readers can cover a large area, instead of dozens of fixed readers.

The main focus is on supporting supply chain management. But this application has also found its way in m-commerce. The customer in the supermarket can scan the Electronic Product Code from the tag and connects via the internet to get more information.

ISO/IEC 29143 "Information technology — Automatic Identification and Data Capture Technique — Air Interface specification for Mobile RFID interrogator" is the first standard to be developed for Mobile RFID.

== See also ==
- MIIM
- RFID
- RTLS
- ISO
