= Radio-frequency identification in schools =

Various schools have been using radio-frequency identification technology to record and monitor students.

== United States ==
It is thought that the first school in the US to introduce RFID technology was Spring Independent School District near Houston, Texas. In 2004, it gave 28,000 students RFID badges to record when students got on and off school buses. This was expanded in 2008 to include location tracking on school campuses. Parents protested in January 2005 when Brittan Elementary School issued RFID to the students. Administrators at a school in Sutter, California, were offered money to test RFID from InCom and issued RFID-chipped ID tags to students. Students and parents felt they were not fully informed about the RFID and questioned the tactics the school used to implement the program, and the ethics of the monetary deal the school made with the company to test and promote its product. Parents quickly squashed the program with help from the American Civil Liberties Union.

In 2012, Northside Independent School District, San Antonio, Texas introduced active RFID, worn on a lanyard around the student's necks. One student refused to participate in the program and was expelled from school, after a court case. The school eventually dropped the RFID program and started tracking students with cameras instead.

== UK ==
In 2007, Hungerhill High School, Doncaster, UK, tried RFID chips sewn into students' blazers. Ten children tested the RFID for attendance. There were privacy concerns, and the trial was stopped.

West Cheshire College integrated active ultra wideband (UWB) RFID into their new college campuses in Chester in 2010, and Ellesmere Port in 2011, to tag students and assets using a real time location system (RTLS). Students wore the active RFID tags around their necks. West Cheshire College stopped RFID tagging students in February 2013. A series of Freedom of Information requests were sent to the college about the RFID tracking of students. Specifications of the active RFID at West Cheshire College:

- Ultra wideband RFID tags emit brief radio frequency signals across the entire 6.35 to 6.75 GHz frequency band.
- Average battery lifespan of a RFID tag is seven years.
- Receivers, which can receive tag signals up to 328 feet away, are located throughout the campus buildings, in order to ensure that the tags can be pinpointed regardless of where within the school a student might be.
- RFID tags provides accuracy to within 1 meter (3.3 feet).
- RFID Tag transmission rate of once per second.
- West Cheshire College uses RFID with a real time location system.
- The real time location system enables observation of student and staff in peer groups.

== Germany ==
After a school shooting in Germany in 2009, which claimed 16 lives, the Friedrich-von-Canitz School implemented a real-time location technology over Wi-Fi. The solution was developed by the German company How To Organize (H2O) GmbH in cooperation with teachers and the local police force.

== India ==
A.B.Patil School, Sangli, Maharastra implemented UHF technology to keep track of student in school premises.

== Passive RFID ==
Passive RFID is used routinely in schools to register teachers and students and to provide access to services such as photocopying and door access.

== See also ==
- PositiveID
