= Liz McIntyre (writer) =

Writer and internet privacy activist

Liz McIntyre is a consumer privacy expert and founder of CAMCAT (Citizens Against Marking, Chipping and Tracking), an organization that works to prevent forced human-tracking technologies like implantable microchips. She and co-author Katherine Albrecht wrote the RFID privacy book Spychips: How Major Corporations and Government Plan to Track your Every Move. At one time, McIntyre was the Communications Director for CASPIAN (Consumers Against Supermarket Privacy Invasion and Numbering), an organization that advocated free-market, consumer-based solutions to the problem of retail privacy invasion.

She and Katherine Albrecht, founder and director of CASPIAN, made the term "spychips" synonymous with RFID, and started the anti-RFID website http://www.spychips.com.

McIntyre continues to write and speak out on privacy issues and works as a privacy consultant.

== Publications ==
=== Books ===
McIntyre co-authored the book Spychips: How Major Corporations and Government Plan to Track Your Every Move with Katherine Albrecht. The book, winner of the 2006 Lysander Spooner Award for advancing the literature of liberty, lays out the privacy and civil liberties implications of RFID. Not surprisingly, RFID industry representatives have criticized the work, claiming it exaggerates some RFID privacy threats. McIntyre and Albrecht have rebutted such criticisms.

McIntyre and Albrecht's second book The Spychips Threat: Why Christians Should Resist RFID and Electronic Surveillance explores how RFID could bring about a world that resembles the one described in Revelation—a world in which people cannot buy or sell without a number.

The book includes a disclaimer that it explores the connection without calling RFID the "Mark of the Beast," but McIntyre says it hasn't kept some from reading far more into her beliefs.

At the Spychips website, McIntyre states the following: "Could a technology like RFID enslave us? Theoretically, yes. Is the RFID implant the prophesied method of controlling humans and forcing beast worship? I don't think so. Could I be wrong? Yes. I don't believe anyone here on earth knows definitively what the future holds and exactly how events will unfold."

She adds, "There are many smart people--people much smarter than myself--Christians and non-Christians--who hold very strong contradictory beliefs on most matters of religion. I take this as a clue that I should remain humble and reverent when it comes to the mysteries of the universe. It's one thing to explore possibilities and keep a watchful eye. It's quite another to claim a hotline to God and infer that others have an inferior connection to the Almighty."

The authors use public documents and the words and deeds of the industry to support their arguments.

=== Articles ===
- Position Paper on the Use of RFID in Consumer Products. Co-authored with Katherine Albrecht and Beth Givens. November 14, 2003.
- "RFID: The Big Brother Bar Code" (Co-authored with Katherine Albrecht) ALEC Policy Forum, Winter 2004, Volume 6, Number 3, pp. 49–54.
- Position Paper on the Use of RFID in Schools. Co-authored with Katherine Albrecht. August 21, 2012. https://web.archive.org/web/20170317015829/http://www.spychips.com/school/RFIDSchoolPositionPaper.pdf
- How and Why to Keep the NSA Out of Your Private Stuff ? Even If You've "Got Nothing to Hide" IEEE Technology and Society Magazine, November 27, 2014 https://ieeexplore.ieee.org/document/6969183/
- Protect Yourself from RFID: Fend off frightening tracking tech. Co-authored with Katherine Albrecht. IEEE Consumer Electronics Magazine, April 13, 2015. https://ieeexplore.ieee.org/document/7084753/
- When Baby Monitors Go Bad. Co-authored with Katherine Albrecht. IEEE Technology and Society Magazine, September 16, 2015. https://ieeexplore.ieee.org/stamp/stamp.jsp?arnumber=7270426
- RFID: Helpful New Technology or Threat to Privacy and Civil Liberties? Co-authored with Katina Michael and Katherine Albrecht. IEEE Potentials, September 4, 2015 https://ieeexplore.ieee.org/abstract/document/7243414/?reload=true

== See also ==
- Microchip implants (human)
