= Baja Beach Club =

Nightclub in Barcelona, Spain

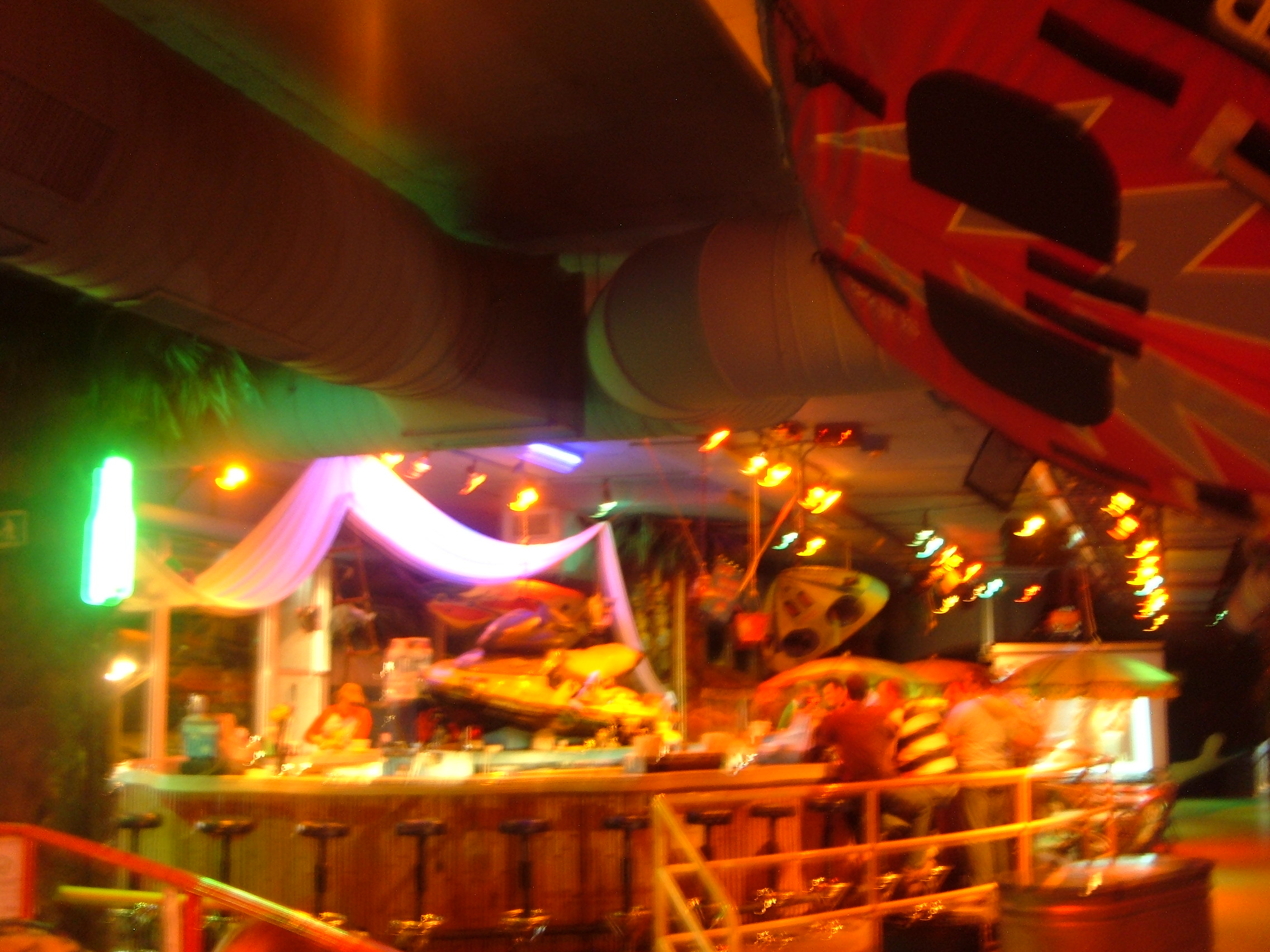
Baja Beach Club in 2006, Barcelona.

The Baja Beach Club was an exclusive nightclub in Barcelona, Catalonia, Spain.

The club made worldwide news in 2004, when it began offering to implant VeriChips into its VIP customers for identification purposes. The club was criticised for making the implanted chips difficult to remove. The scheme has drawn strong criticism from civil liberty movements as well as religious organisations.

At the location of the Baja Beach Club is now operates the Opium Mar Club, with a different concept.
