= Microchip implant =

Microchip implant can refer to:

- Microchip implant (animal)
- Microchip implant (human)
