= Microchip implant (human) =

Device implanted into a human

A human microchip implant is any electronic device implanted subcutaneously (subdermally) usually via an injection. Examples include an identifying integrated circuit RFID device encased in silicate glass which is implanted in the body of a human being. This type of subdermal implant usually contains a unique ID number that can be linked to information contained in an external database, such as identity document, criminal record, medical history, medications, address book, and other potential uses.

== History ==
- 1998: The first experiments with a radio-frequency identification (RFID) implant were carried out in 1998 by the British scientist Kevin Warwick. His implant was used to open doors, switch on lights, and cause verbal output within a building. After nine days the implant was removed and has since been held in the Science Museum in London.
- March 18, 2004: Nokia, Philips and Sony established the NFC Forum, a non-profit industry formed to advance the use of near-field communication (NFC) wireless interaction in consumer electronics, mobile devices and PCs. Standards include the four distinct tag types that provide different communication speeds and capabilities covering flexibility, memory, security, data retention and write endurance. NFC Forum promotes implementation and standardization of NFC technology to ensure interoperability between devices and services.
- 2018: VivoKey Technologies developed the first cryptographically secure human implantable NFC transponders in 2018. The Spark is an AES128 bit capable ISO/IEC 15693 2 mm by 12 mm bioglass encased injectable device. The Flex One is an implantable contactless secure element, capable of running Java Card applets (software programs) including Bitcoin wallets, PGP, OATH OTP, U2F, WebAuthn, etc. It is encapsulated in a flat, flexible 7 mm × 34 mm × 0.4 mm flat biopolymer shell. Applets can be deployed to the Flex One before or after implantation.
- 28 August 2020: Neuralink CEO Elon Musk, held a broadcast showcasing a pig with a coin-sized computer chip in her brain to demonstrate the company's plans to create a working brain-to-machine interface for humans.
- 2021: DSruptive Subdermals tested a COVID-19 vaccine passport in their bioglass-coated NFC microchip designed to be implanted in the subcutaneous tissue. It has been demonstrated by its managing director Hannes Sjöblad who wears the chip in his arm, but the product was not offered for sale.

=== Chipped individuals ===
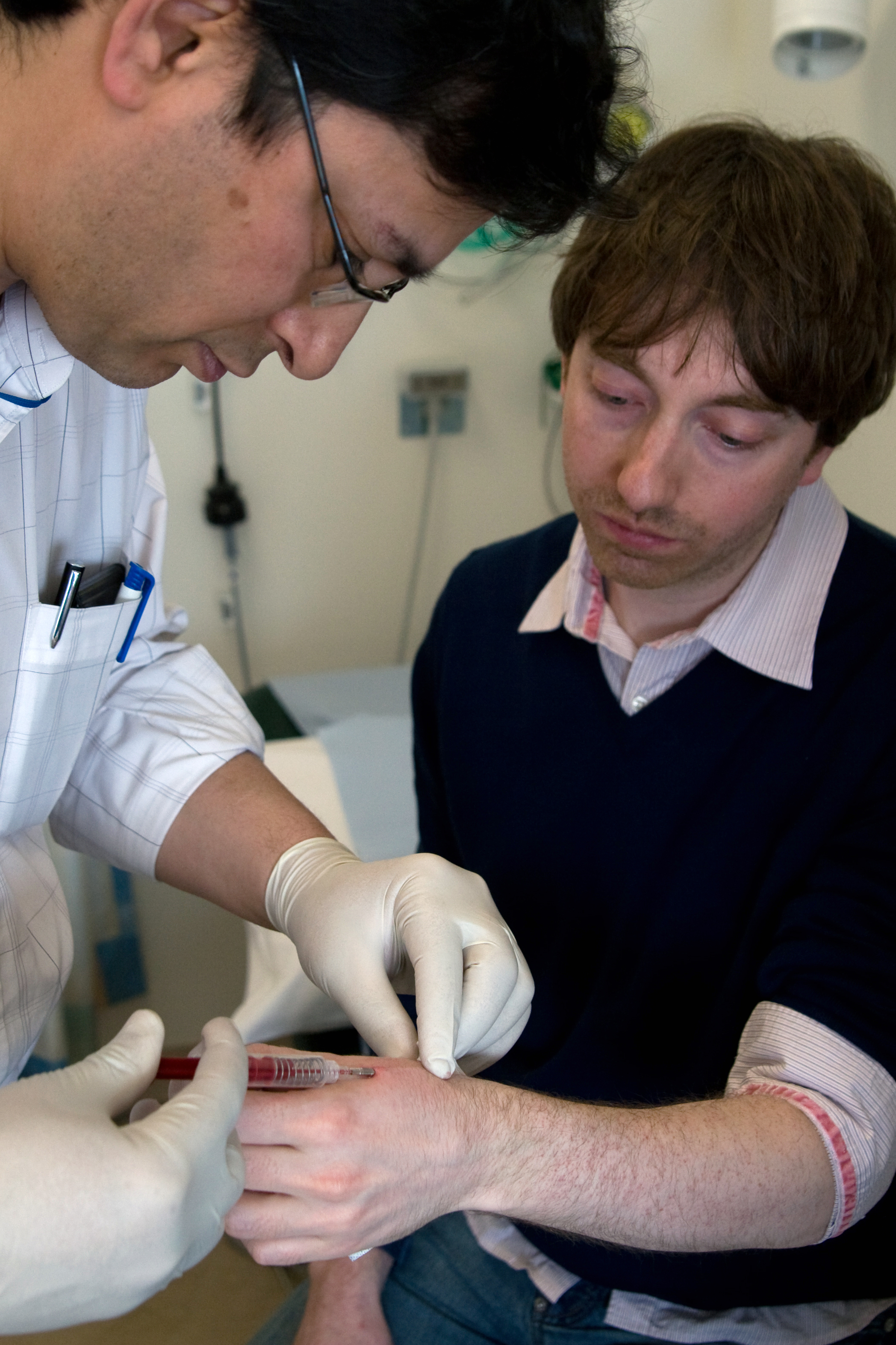
A surgeon implants an RFID microchip in the left hand of British scientist Dr. Mark Gasson (March 16, 2009).

Several hobbyists, scientists and business personalities have placed RFID microchip implants into their hands or had them inserted by others.

- 2005, Amal Graafstra: In early March 2005 hobbyist Amal Graafstra implanted a 125 kHz EM4102 bioglass-encased RFID transponder into his left hand. It was used with an access control system to gain entry to his office. Soon after in June 2005 he implanted a more advanced HITAG S 2048 low frequency transponder. In 2006 he authored the book RFID Toys, Graafstra uses his implants to access his home, open car doors, and to log on to his computer. With public interest growing, in 2013 he launched biohacking company Dangerous Things and crowdfunded the world's first implantable NFC transponder in 2014. He has also built a smartgun that only fires after reading his implant.
- 2006, Mikey Sklar: Mikey Sklar had a chip implanted into his left hand and filmed the procedure.
- 2009, Mark Gasson: On 16 March 2009 British scientist Mark Gasson had a glass capsule RFID device surgically implanted into his left hand. In April 2010 Gasson's team demonstrated how a computer virus could wirelessly infect his implant and then be transmitted on to other systems.
- 2013, Tim Cannon: In October 2013, Cannon became the first person to be implanted with the Grindhouse-designed biometric sensor known as Circadia, a procedure which was performed by body modification artist Steve Haworth in Essen, Germany.
- 2014, Martijn Wismeijer: Dutch marketing manager for Bitcoin ATM manufacturer General Bytes, placed RFID chips in both of his hands to store his Bitcoin private keys and business card.
- 2014, Nikolas Badminton: In June 2014, during the From Now Conference in Vancouver, Canada, event organizer and futurist Nikolas Badminton had an xNT chip implanted into his left hand on stage by noted biohacker Amal Graafstra.
- 2015, Jonathan Oxer: Self-implanted an RFID chip in his arm using a veterinary implantation tool.
- 2015, Patric Lanhed: sent a "bio-payment" of one euro worth of Bitcoin using a chip embedded in his hand.
- 2016, Hannes Sjöblad: Biohacker Hannes Sjöblad has been experimenting with near field communication (NFC) chip implants since 2015. During his talk at Echappée Volée 2016 in Paris, Sjöblad disclosed that he has also implanted himself with a chip between his forefinger and thumb and uses it to unlock doors, make payments, unlock his phone, and essentially replacing anything that is put in one's pockets. Additionally, Sjöblad has hosted several "implant parties," where interested individuals can also be implanted with the chip. In October 2021, Sjöblad appeared in a video interview with Aftonbladet where he demonstrated how he receives a QR code when he scans a microchip implant in his arm that contains his EU Digital COVID Certificate (EUDCC).
- Marcel Varallo had an NXP chip coated in Bioglass 8625 inserted into his hand between his forefinger and thumb allowing him to open secure elevators and doors at work, print from secure printers, unlock his mobile phone and home, and store his digital business card for transfer to mobile phones enabled for NFC.
- 2021, Shain Lakin: In late September 2021 during the Security BSides Perth 2021 Conference, Hacker Shain Lakin demonstrated using an NXP Semiconductors chip inserted into his hand to remotely trigger ignition of a thermite charge in order to destroy a solid-state drive (SSD) inside a personal computer.

== Types of implants ==
- Brain implant
- Skin
  - Dermal implant (on the skin): Invisible transdermal patch
  - Sub-dermal implants (under the skin): Bioglass coated NFC chip injected under the skin.
- Dental implant

== Usage ==
For microchip implants that are encapsulated in silicate glass, there exists multiple methods to embed the device subcutaneously ranging from placing the microchip implant in a syringe or trocar and piercing under the flesh (subdermal) then releasing the syringe to using a cutting tool such as a surgical scalpel to cut open subdermal and positioning the implant in the open wound.

A uses for microchip implants include:

- Address book
- Cryptocurrency wallet
- Keycard
- Medical history/medical records
- Medical identification tag
- Payment cards
- Travel cards
- NFC Security token
- Time-based one-time password

Other uses either cosmetic or medical may also include;

=== Digital identity ===
RFID implants using NFC technologies have been used as access cards ranging for car door entry to building access. Secure identity has also been used to encapsulate or impersonate a users identity via secure element or related technologies.

=== Medical records ===
Researchers have examined microchip implants in humans in the medical field and they indicate that there are potential benefits and risks to incorporating the device in the medical field. For example, it could be beneficial for noncompliant patients but still poses great risks for potential misuse of the device.

Destron Fearing, a subsidiary of Digital Angel, initially developed the technology for the VeriChip.

In 2004, the VeriChip implanted device and reader were classified as Class II: General controls with special controls by the FDA; that year the FDA also published a draft guidance describing the special controls required to market such devices.

About the size of a grain of rice, the device was typically implanted between the shoulder and elbow area of an individual's right arm. Once scanned at the proper frequency, the chip responded with a unique 16-digit number which could be then linked with information about the user held on a database for identity verification, medical records access and other uses. The insertion procedure was performed under local anesthetic in a physician's office.

Privacy advocates raised concerns regarding potential abuse of the chip, with some warning that adoption by governments as a compulsory identification program could lead to erosion of civil liberties, as well as identity theft if the device should be hacked. Another ethical dilemma posed by the technology is that people with dementia could possibly benefit the most from an implanted device that contained their medical records, but issues of informed consent are the most difficult in precisely such people.

In June 2007, the American Medical Association declared that "implantable radio frequency identification (RFID) devices may help to identify patients, thereby improving the safety and efficiency of patient care, and may be used to enable secure access to patient clinical information", but in the same year, news reports linking similar devices to cancer caused in laboratory animals.

In 2010, the company, by then called PositiveID, withdrew the product from the market due to poor sales.

In January 2012, PositiveID sold the chip assets to a company called VeriTeQ that was owned by Scott Silverman, the former CEO of Positive ID.

In 2016, JAMM Technologies acquired the chip assets from VeriTeQ; JAMM's business plan was to partner with companies selling implanted medical devices and use the RFID tags to monitor and identify the devices. JAMM Technologies is co-located in the same Plymouth, Minnesota building as Geissler Corporation with Randolph K. Geissler and Donald R. Brattain listed as its principals. The website also claims that Geissler was CEO of PositiveID Corporation, Destron Fearing Corporation, and Digital Angel Corporation.

In 2018, a Danish firm called BiChip released a new generation of microchip implant that is intended to be readable from a distance and connected to Internet. The company released an update for its microchip implant to associate it with the Ripple cryptocurrency to allow payments to be made using the implanted microchip.

Patients that undergo NFC implants do so for a variety of reasons ranging from, Biomedical diagnostics, health reasons to gaining new senses, gain biological enhancement, to be part of existing growing movements, for workplace purposes, security, hobbyists and for scientific endeavour.

In 2020, a London-based firm called Impli released a microchip implant that is intended to be used with an accompanying smartphone app. The primary functionality of the implant is as a storage of medical records. The implant can be scanned by any smartphone that has NFC capabilities.

=== Building access and security ===
In February 2006, CityWatcher, Inc. of Cincinnati, OH became the first company in the world to implant microchips into their employees as part of their building access control and security system. The workers needed the implants to access the company's secure video tape room, as documented in USA Today. The project was initiated and implemented by Six Sigma Security, Inc. The VeriChip Corporation had originally marketed the implant as a way to restrict access to secure facilities such as power plants.

A major drawback for such systems is the relative ease with which the 16-digit ID number contained in a chip implant can be obtained and cloned using a hand-held device, a problem that has been demonstrated publicly by security researcher Jonathan Westhues and documented in the May 2006 issue of Wired magazine, among other places.

- The Baja Beach Club, a nightclub in Rotterdam, the Netherlands, once used VeriChip implants for identifying VIP guests.
- The Epicenter in Stockholm, Sweden is using RFID implants for employees to operate security doors, copiers, and pay for lunch.

=== Proposed uses ===
In 2017, Mike Miller, chief executive of the World Olympians Association, was widely reported as suggesting the use of such implants in athletes in an attempt to reduce problems in sports due to recreational drug use.

Theoretically, a GPS-enabled chip could one day make it possible for individuals to be physically located by latitude, longitude, altitude, and velocity, however GPS devices require constant and not insignificant power to function, and so in practice this would rely on non-existent microscopic batteries with sufficient energy density to power the device for many years without maintenance. Such a chip would require a powerful transmitting antenna similar to those found in modern smart phones in order to actually communicate, which would draw significant power. Even with a very efficient chip, an advanced battery several centimeters on a side, which is significantly larger than could actually be feasibly implanted, would be drained in only a few weeks. However, if widely deployed at some future point, implantable GPS devices could conceivably allow authorities to locate missing people, fugitives, or those who fled a crime scene. Critics contend that the technology could lead to political repression as governments could use implants to track and persecute human rights activists, labor activists, civil dissidents, and political opponents; criminals and domestic abusers could use them to stalk, harass, and/or abduct their victims.

Another suggested application for a tracking implant, discussed in 2008 by the legislature of Indonesia's Irian Jaya would be to monitor the activities of people infected with HIV, aimed at reducing their chances of infecting other people. The microchipping section was not, however, included in the final version of the provincial HIV/AIDS Handling bylaw passed by the legislature in December 2008. With current technology, this would not be workable anyway, since there is no implantable device on the market with GPS tracking capability.

Some have theorized that governments could use implants for:

- Central bank digital currency (CBDC).
- Electronic identification (eID).
- Immunity passport, such as digital variants of COVID-19 vaccine passports.

== Criticisms and concerns ==
=== Infection ===
Infection has been cited as a source of failure within RFID and related microchip implanted individuals, either due to improper implantation techniques, implant rejections or corrosion of implant elements.

=== MRIs ===
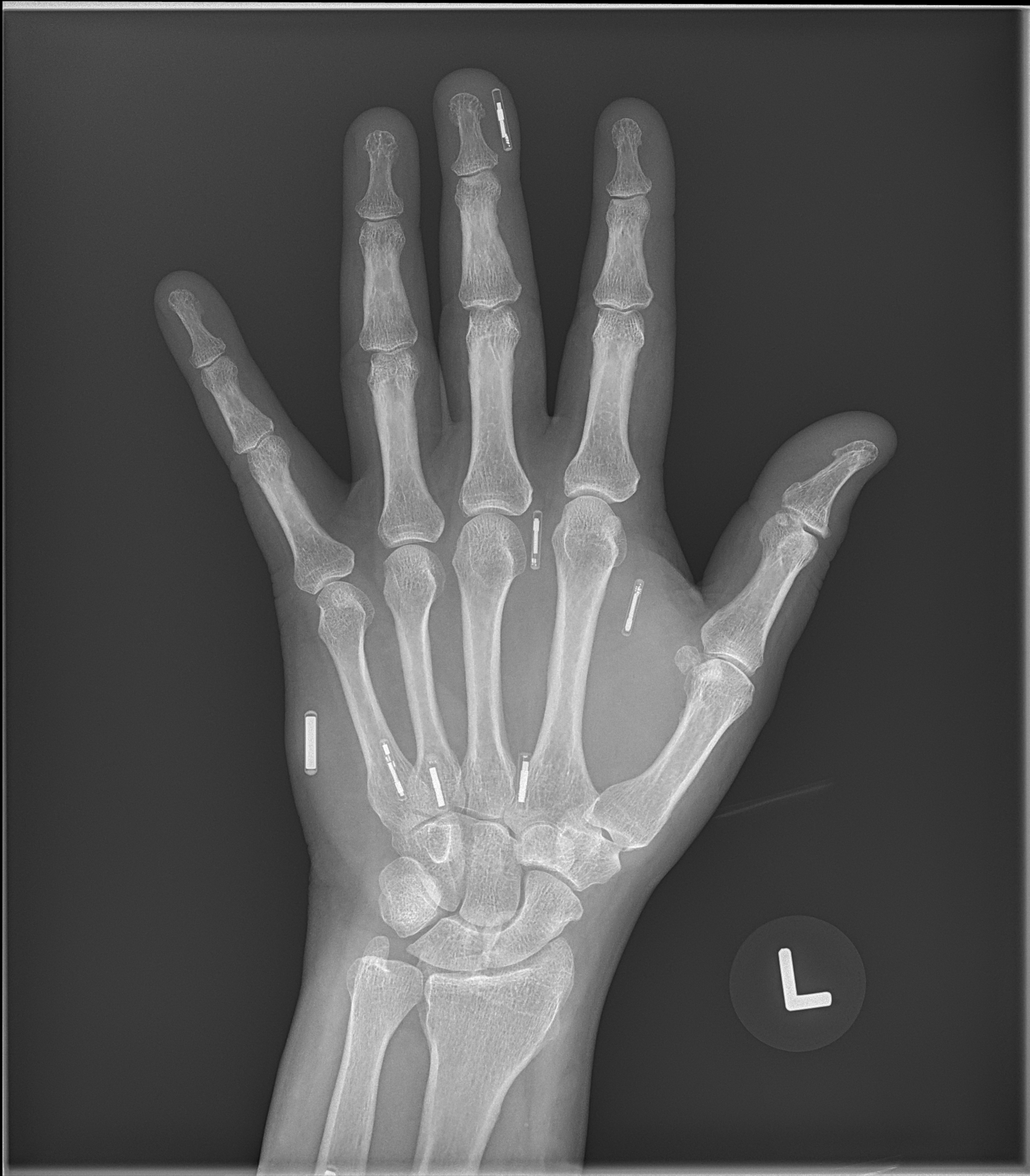
An X-ray of a biohacker's hand showing several implants

Some chipped individuals have reported being turned away from magnetic resonance imaging scans (MRIs) due to the presence of magnets in their body. No conclusive investigation has been done on the risks of each type of implant near MRIs, other than anecdotal reports ranging from no problems, requiring hand shielding before proximity, to being denied the MRI.

Other medical imaging technologies like X-ray and CT scanners do not pose a similar risk. Rather, X-rays can be used to locate implants.

=== Corrosion ===
Electronics-based implants contain little material that can corrode. Magnetic implants, however, often contain a substantial amount of metallic elements by volume, and iron, a common implant element, is easily corroded by common elements such as oxygen and water. Implant corrosion occurs when these elements become trapped inside during the encapsulation process, which can cause slow corrosive effect, or the encapsulation fails and allows corrosive elements to come into contact with the magnet. Catastrophic encapsulation failures are usually obvious, resulting in tenderness, discoloration of the skin, and a slight inflammatory response. Small failures however can take much longer to become obvious, resulting in a slow degradation of field strength without many external signs that something is slowly going wrong with the magnet.

=== Cancer risks ===
In a self-published report, anti-RFID advocate Katherine Albrecht, who refers to RFID devices as "spy chips", cites veterinary and toxicological studies carried out from 1996 to 2006 which found lab rodents injected with microchips as an incidental part of unrelated experiments and dogs implanted with identification microchips sometimes developed cancerous tumors at the injection site (subcutaneous sarcomas) as evidence of a human implantation risk. However, the link between foreign-body tumorigenesis in lab animals and implantation in humans has been publicly refuted as erroneous and misleading and the report's author has been criticized over the use of "provocative" language "not based in scientific fact". Notably, none of the studies cited specifically set out to investigate the cancer risk of implanted microchips and so none of the studies had a control group of animals that did not get implanted. While the issue is considered worthy of further investigation, one of the studies cited cautioned "Blind leaps from the detection of tumors to the prediction of human health risk should be avoided".

=== Stolen identity, privacy, security risks ===
The Council on Ethical and Judicial Affairs (CEJA) of the American Medical Association published a report in 2007 alleging that RFID implanted chips may compromise privacy because even though no information can be stored in an RFID transponder, they allege that there is no assurance that the information contained in the chip can be properly protected.

Stolen identity and privacy has been a major concern with microchip implants being cloned for various nefarious reasons in a process known as wireless identity theft. Incidents of forced removal of animal implants have been documented, the concern lies in whether this same practice will be used to attack implanted microchipped patients also. Due to low adoption of microchip implants incidents of these physical attacks are rare. Nefarious RFID reprogramming of unprotected or unencrypted microchip tags are also a major security risk consideration.

=== Risk to human freedom and autonomy ===
There is concern that the technology can be abused. Opponents have stated that such invasive technology has the potential to be used by governments to create an 'Orwellian' digital dystopia and theorized that in such a world, self-determination, the ability to think freely, and all personal autonomy could be completely lost.

=== Ableism ===
In 2019, Elon Musk announced that a company he had founded which deals with microchip implant research, called Neuralink, would be able to "solve" autism and other "brain diseases". This led to a number of people criticizing Musk for his statements, with Dan Robitzski of Neoscope saying, "while schizophrenia can be a debilitating mental condition, autism is more tightly linked to a sense of identity — and listing it as a disease to be solved as Musk did risks further stigmatizing a community pushing for better treatment and representation." Hilary Brueck of Insider agreed, saying, "conditions like autism can't be neatly cataloged as things to "solve." Instead, they lead people to think differently". She went on to argue though that the technology shouldn't be discounted entirely, as it could potentially help people with a variety of disabilities such as blindness and quadriplegia. Fellow Insider writer Isobel Asher Hamilton added, "it was not clear what Musk meant by saying Neuralink could "solve" autism, which is not a disease but a developmental disorder." She then cited The UK's National Autistic Society's website statement, which says, "Autism is not an illness or disease and cannot be 'cured.' Often people feel being autistic is a fundamental aspect of their identity." Tristan Greene of The Next Web stated, in response to Musk, "there's only one problem: autism isn't a disease and it can't be cured or solved. In fact, there's some ethical debate in the medical community over whether autism, which is considered a disorder, should be treated as part of a person's identity and not a 'condition' to be fixed... how freaking cool would it be to actually start your Tesla [electric vehicle] just by thinking? But, maybe... just maybe, the billionaire with access to the world's brightest medical minds who, even after founding a medical startup, still incorrectly thinks that autism is a disease that can be solved or cured shouldn't be someone we trust to shove wires or chips into our brains."

Some autistic people also spoke out against Musk's statement about using microchips to "solve" autism, with Nera Birch of The Mighty, an autistic writer, stating, "autism is a huge part of who I am. It pervades every aspect of my life. Sure, there are days where being neurotypical would make everything so much easier. But I wouldn't trade my autism for the world. I have the unique ability to view the world and experience senses in a way that makes all the negatives of autism worth it. The fact you think I would want to be "cured" is like saying I would rather be nothing than be myself. People with neurodiversity are proud of ourselves. For many of us, we wear our autism as a badge of pride. We have a culture within ourselves. It is not something that needs to be erased. The person with autism is not the problem. Neurotypical people need to stop molding us into something they want to interact with." Florence Grant, an autistic writer for The Independent, stated, "autistic people often have highly-focused interests, also known as special interests. I love my ability to hyperfocus and how passionate I get about things. I also notice small details and things that other people don't see. I see the world differently, through a clear lens, and this means I can identify solutions where other people can't. Does this sound familiar, Elon? My autism is a part of me, and it's not something that can be separated from me. I should be able to exist freely autistic and proud. But for that to happen, the world needs to stop punishing difference and start embracing it." Grant noted that Musk himself had recently admitted that he had been diagnosed with Asperger's syndrome (itself an outdated diagnosis, the characteristics of which are currently recognized as part of the autism spectrum) while hosting Saturday Night Live.

Musk himself has not specified how Neuralink's microchip technology would "solve" autism, and has not commented publicly on the feedback from autistic people.

== Misinformation ==
Despite a lack of evidence demonstrating invasive use or even technical capability of microchip implants, they have been the subject of many conspiracy theories.

The Southern Poverty Law Center reported in 2010 that on the Christian right, there were concerns that implants could be the "mark of the beast" and amongst the Patriot movement there were fears that implants could be used to track people. The same year NPR reported that a myth was circulating online that patients who signed up to receive treatment under the Affordable Care Act (Obamacare) would be implanted.

In 2016, Snopes reported that being injected with microchips was a "perennial concern to the conspiracy-minded" and noted that a conspiracy theory was circulating in Australia at that time that the government was going to implant all of its citizens.

A 2021 survey by YouGov found that 20% of Americans believed microchips were inside the COVID-19 vaccines. A 2021 Facebook post by RT (Russia Today) claimed DARPA had developed a COVID-19 detecting microchip implant.

== Legislation ==
A few jurisdictions have researched or preemptively passed laws regarding human implantation of microchips.

=== United States ===
In the United States, many states such as Wisconsin (as of 2006), North Dakota (2007), California (2007), Oklahoma (2008), and Georgia (2010) have laws making it illegal to force a person to have a microchip implanted, though politicians acknowledge they are unaware of cases of such forced implantation. In 2010, Virginia passed a bill forbidding companies from forcing employees to be implanted with tracking devices.

In 2010, Washington's House of Representatives introduced a bill ordering the study of potential monitoring of sex offenders with implanted RFID or similar technology, but it did not pass.

In March 2026, House Bill 2303 was passed and signed in Washington state, denying companies the ability to ask for or require a microchip implant.

== Views ==
The general public are most familiar with microchips in the context of identifying pets.

=== In popular culture ===
Implanted individuals are considered to be grouped together as part of the transhumanism movement.

"Arkangel", an episode of the drama series Black Mirror, considered the potential for helicopter parenting of an imagined more advanced microchip.

Microchip implants have been explored in cyberpunk media such as Ghost in the Shell, Cyberpunk 2077, and Deus Ex.

=== Religious beliefs ===
Some Christians make a link between implants and the Biblical Mark of the Beast, prophesied to be a future requirement for buying and selling, and a key element of the Book of Revelation. Gary Wohlscheid, president of These Last Days Ministries, has argued that "Out of all the technologies with potential mark of the beast, VeriChip has got the best possibility right now."

== See also ==
- ISO 11784 and ISO 11785
- Ambient intelligence
- Body hacking
