= Petkey =

Pet recovery service

Petkey is a pet recovery service based in Wixom, Michigan of the United States, available in North America. It's the largest non microchip manufacturer owned pet recovery service. Upon enrollment, a pet's information is documented including the pet's photograph, description and emergency contact information. If the pet has a microchip implant, that number is also documented. When a registered pet is lost or stolen the service sends a bulletin to its members, shelter groups, veterinary clinics, trainers, pet supply retailers, and grooming shops in a 50-mile (80 km) radius of the pet's last known location.

== History ==
Petkey was established in 2004 to facilitate the reunification of lost pets with their owners through microchip registration. Petkey is a microchip supplier and registration database for pet owners, breeders, veterinary practices, shelters and other pet professionals. Petkey operates across the United States and Canada and supports industry-standard recovery processes, including participation in microchip lookup systems used by animal welfare and veterinary organizations. The company’s services focus on pet identification through microchip registration, accurate data record keeping, and the ongoing improvement of reunification and recovery tools.
