= Wetware =

Wetware may refer to:

- Wetware, a 2000 album by The Cassandra Complex (band)
- Wetware (brain), a term drawn from the computer-related idea of hardware or software, but applied to biological life forms
- Wetware (biology), biological components
- Wetware (novel), a 1988 Rudy Rucker biopunk novel
- Wetware (film), 2018 Jay Craven film
- Wetware computer, a computer or computational system which is composed of organic material, such as neurons
- Grindhouse Wetware, an open source biotechnology startup company based in Pittsburgh, Pennsylvania
