= Pet recovery service =

Service to reunite lost pets with their owners

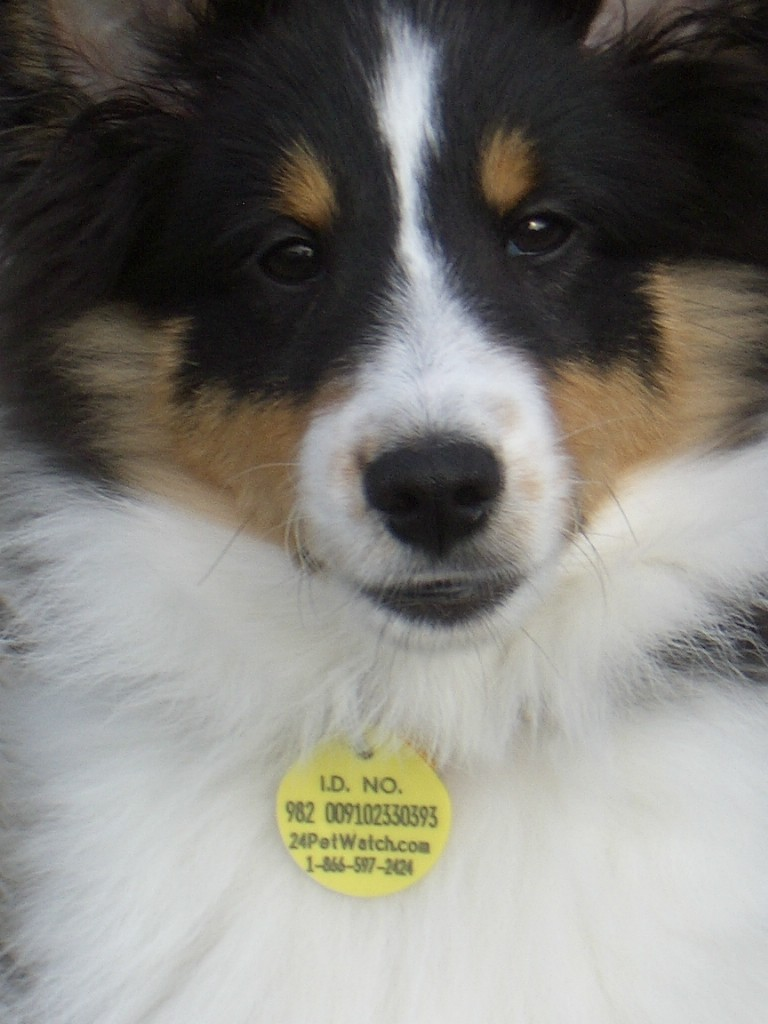
A dog wearing a pet tag

The goal of a pet recovery service is to reunite owners with their lost or stolen pets.

== Pet recovery ==
=== Without identification tags ===
A wide variety of pet recovery services exist, including online services to search for lost pets. Less traditional services for searching for lost pets include the use of a bloodhound, a pet detective, or sites that offer a bulk-calling computer that can quickly alert neighbors by phone.

=== With identification tags ===
==== External identification ====
Forms of external identification include collar tags with identifying information, or QR codes with pet information or pet recovery service information. The pet could be tracked through a service toll-free number or web address on the tag; the service accesses the pet and owner information in a database via a number or QR code. Some pet identification tags include the owner's address or phone number, which can be used to reunite the pet with its owner. There are also registry database services based on tattoo registries.

==== Electronic tracking devices ====
Recovery service providers use collar-attached electronic tracking devices to reunite the pet with its owner. The contract may also include recovery services, which eliminates any need to rely on a stranger encountering the pet. However, at least one device also calls for help from anyone nearby. This depends on whether the device is GPS, radio, or Bluetooth.

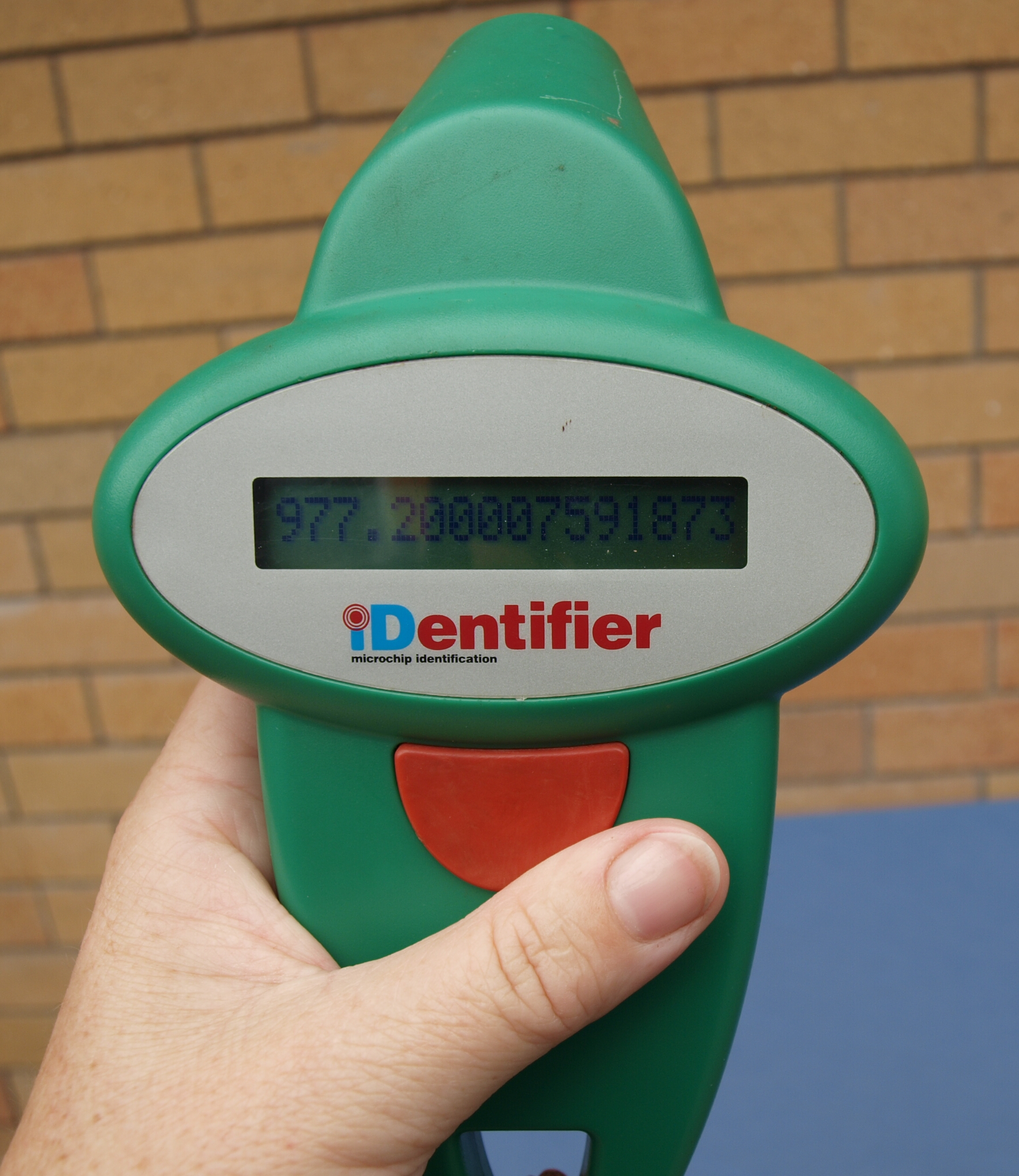
Example of an RFID (radio-frequency identification) scanner used with animal microchip implants.

==== Microchip implant ====
Since the early 1990s, advocates have promoted the under-skin I.D. tag or microchip implant as a collar-free solution for pet recovery. Veterinary services, animal shelters, and some individuals have chip scanners. In the U.S., such services are unregulated, and several types of chips have emerged with only some adhering to the pertinent ISO standards, ISO 11784 and ISO 11785. Originally, each type had its own scanner with no ability to read or even detect other types. However, there is a trend toward universal scanners that can read all types. Unlike the identifying collar tags mentioned above, the appropriate database keeper cannot always be determined from the ID number, complicating the task of returning the pet to its owner.

==== Metasearch engines ====
As an aid to the pet finder in this situation, chip registry metasearch engines have been established. Two that have been available at least since 2003 are Europetnet, which has a large number of participating European registries, and Petmaxx, a worldwide registry service. In 2009, the metasearch engine, sponsored by the American Animal Hospital Association, was put online. Most of the major U.S. registries are now participants.

Pets are reunited with their owners by the stray pet's code, whose information is accessed via a database. The services are only accessed where chip registry services have decided to interface with metasearch engine services.

Successful metasearch engines connect to all the available registries and can help the pet finder or dog warden find the one registry that has an owner record for a found stray. A potential downfall is that if the pet's information is not registered with all databases, a thief can steal the animal using the secure and tamper-proof' ID device. Then, they can register the stolen pet with another database and sell the animal, transferring an apparent clear title in the form of a login account at, or registration document from, the second registry.

A drawback of metasearch engines is that many shelters do not have the resources to search registry sites for owner information once they access the chip number. The chip number may simply be entered in the paperwork, never contacting the owner.

==== Microchip Registration Database ====
To ensure lost pets are reunited with their owners, it is best to have them microchipped and to register them with the chip manufacturer and/or one of the chip-agnostic pet recovery services, such as registries participating in the American Animal Hospital Association (AAHA) Universal Pet Microchip Lookup Tool (e.g., AKC Reunite, HomeAgain, Pawbase). An implantable chip is more secure than a collar tag because the chip cannot be moved between pets or lost, as can a collar tag. A typical pet microchip registration costs $25 to $100 per year, and it is incumbent upon the owner to maintain the accuracy of the database in the event of a move or change in contact information. To remind pet owners to check and update their information, the American Animal Hospital Association and the American Veterinary Medical Association have established August 15 as Check a Chip Day.

Registering and keeping the owner's contact information up-to-date is a problem facing the pet microchip industry. Without up-to-date information, a lost pet is less likely to be returned to its owner. According to an Ohio State University study, the main reasons owners aren't found for lost pets included incorrect or disconnected phone numbers (35.4%), the owner's failure to return phone calls or respond to letters (24.3%), unregistered microchips (9.8%), or microchips registered in a database that differed from the manufacturer (17.2%). At a subscription cost to the owner that is typically annual, each microchip manufacturer maintains their registration database. However, these registration databases only hold information related to the chips they manufacture. This requires a pet finder that does not know who the manufacturer is to search multiple sources to report a found pet. There are free registration databases available, such as those at Veripet's Rabies Reader Page and Found Animals Microchip Registry are chip manufacture agnostic.

A recovery database of last resort at the American Animal Hospital Association (AAHA) provides a lookup tool that will redirect a user to the manufacturer's recovery desk. However, they do not provide owner information or notifications to them. AAHA works only with those manufacturers and recovery services that provide a hotline where a pet finder can report a found pet.

== Other related resources ==
- Hotlines: Several veterinary schools around the United States have pet loss support hotlines, as well as various nonprofit agencies.
- Online forums for grieving pet owners.
- Grief counseling: Therapists with training in grief therapy can be located in some communities. In addition, therapists may also include support groups that meet regularly to discuss issues surrounding pet loss.

== See also ==
- Microchip implant (animal)
- American Humane Association
- Rescue group for pets
- Petkey
