= ISO 14223 =

International standard for advanced animal transponders

ISO 14223 Radiofrequency identification of animals — Advanced transponders is an international standard that specifies the structure of the radio frequency (RF) code for advanced transponders for animals. The technical concept of advanced transponders for animal identification described is based upon the principle of radio frequency identification (RFID) and is an extension of the standards ISO 11784 and ISO 11785. This part of the standard describes the air interface between transceiver and advanced transponder.

Apart from the transmission of the (unique) identification code of animals, application of advanced technologies facilitates the storage and retrieval of additional information (integrated database), the implementation of authentication methods and reading of the data of integrated sensors, etc. This standard consists of three parts as described in the foreword:

- Part 1: Air interface
- Part 2: Code and command structure
- Part 3: Applications

This standard has been published. On December 14, 2007, the standard entered stage 90.92 ("International Standard to be revised") in accordance with the ISO international harmonized stage codes.
