= Magnetic implant =

Procedure where a magnet is inserted to create a sense of magnetism

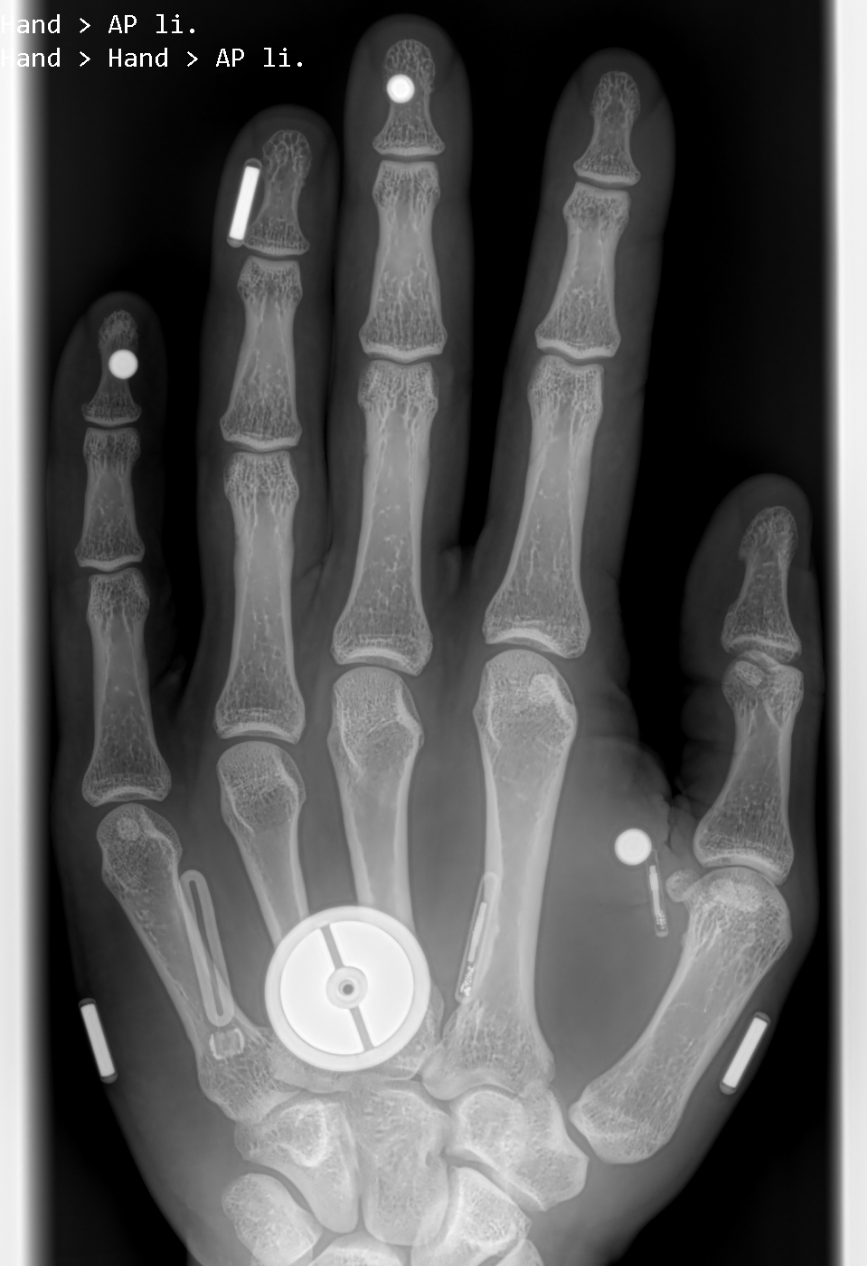
Xray showing magnet and RFID implants in hand

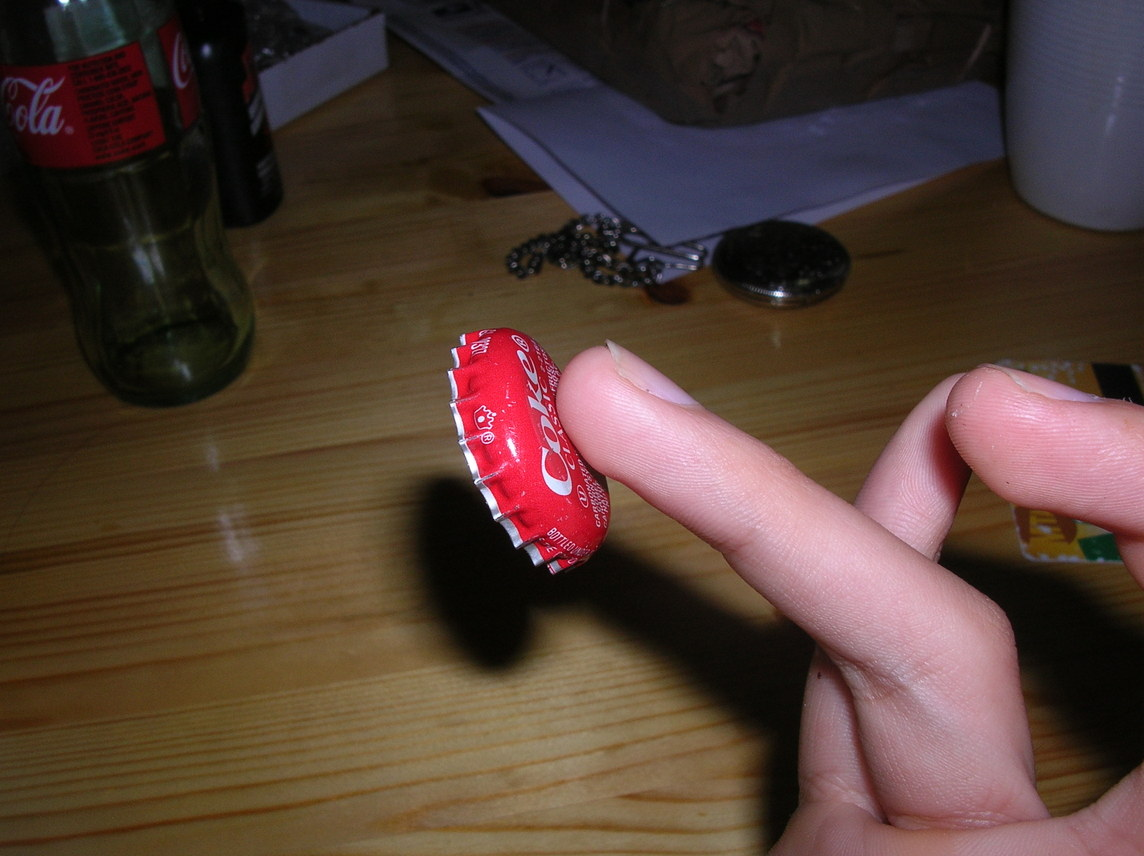
A magnetic implant lifting a bottle cap

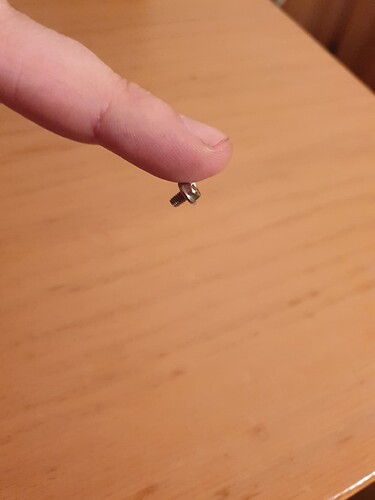
Implanted magnets can hold small ferrous items.

Magnetic implant is an experimental procedure in which small, powerful magnets (such as neodymium) are inserted beneath the skin, often in the tips of fingers. They exist in tubes and discs. This procedure is popular among biohackers and grinders, but remains experimental. Magnetic implants are often performed by amateurs at home, using readily available surgical tools and magnets found online. However, some professional body modification shops do perform implant surgeries. Magnetic implants can also be used as an interface for portable devices to create other new "senses", for example converting other sensory inputs such as ultrasonic or infra-red into a touch sensation. In this way the individual could 'feel' e.g. the distance to objects.

== Purpose ==
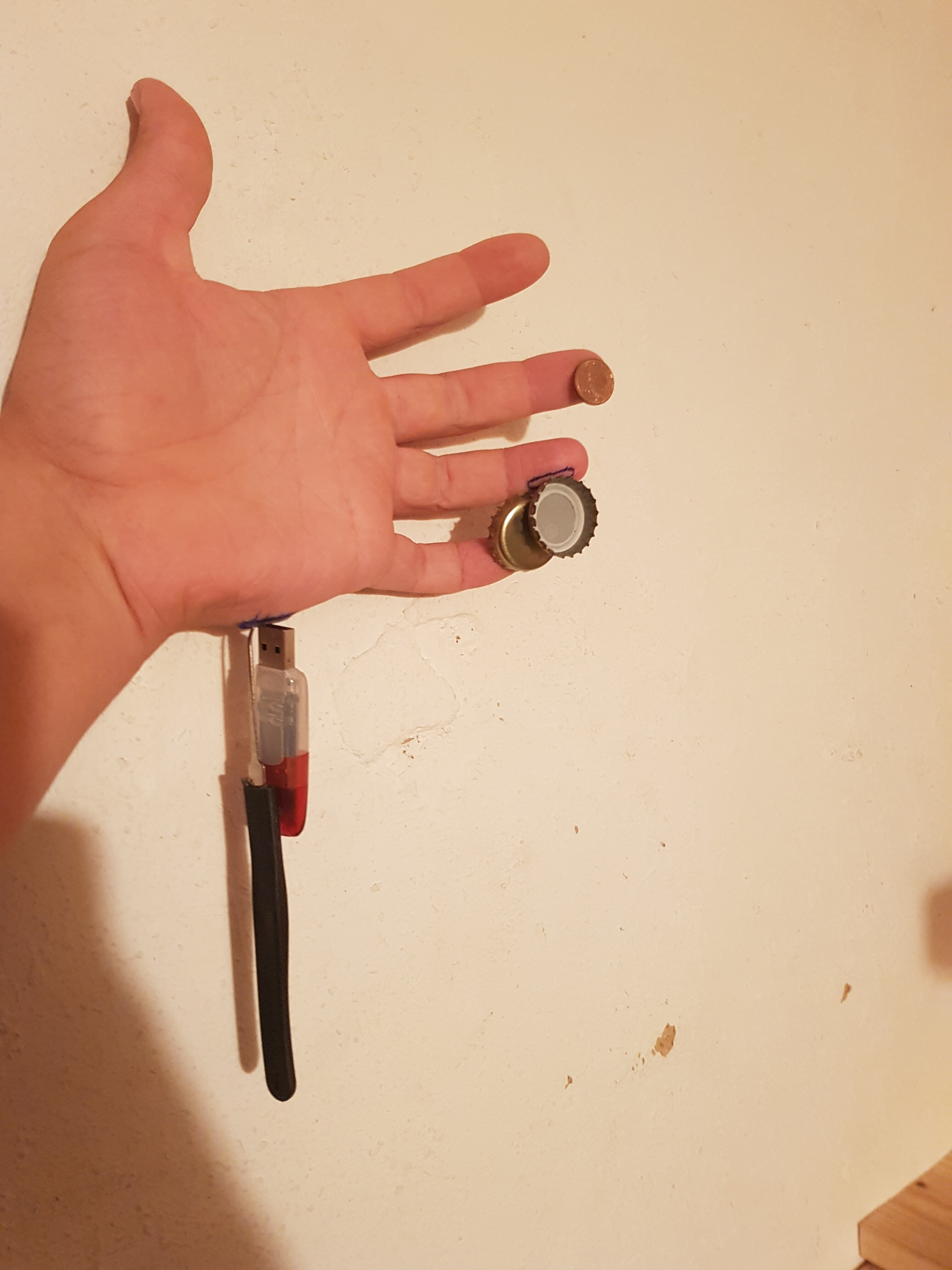
Subdermal magnets

Though magnetic implants can be used to pick up small metal objects, the main purpose of getting an implant is in order to gain sensory perception of magnetic fields. After a magnet is implanted underneath the epidermal layer of the skin, nerves grow around the magnet as the skin heals. The magnet pushes against magnetic fields produced by electronic devices in the surrounding area, pushing against the nerves and giving a "sixth sense" of magnetic vision. Some people prefer to have multiple implants in several fingers in order to get a more "3D" view of the magnetic fields around them, but one magnetic implant is enough to be able to feel magnetic fields. This means that people with magnetic implants have sensations of running electric motors, electronic circuits, appliances, and even wires.

== Magnets and coatings ==
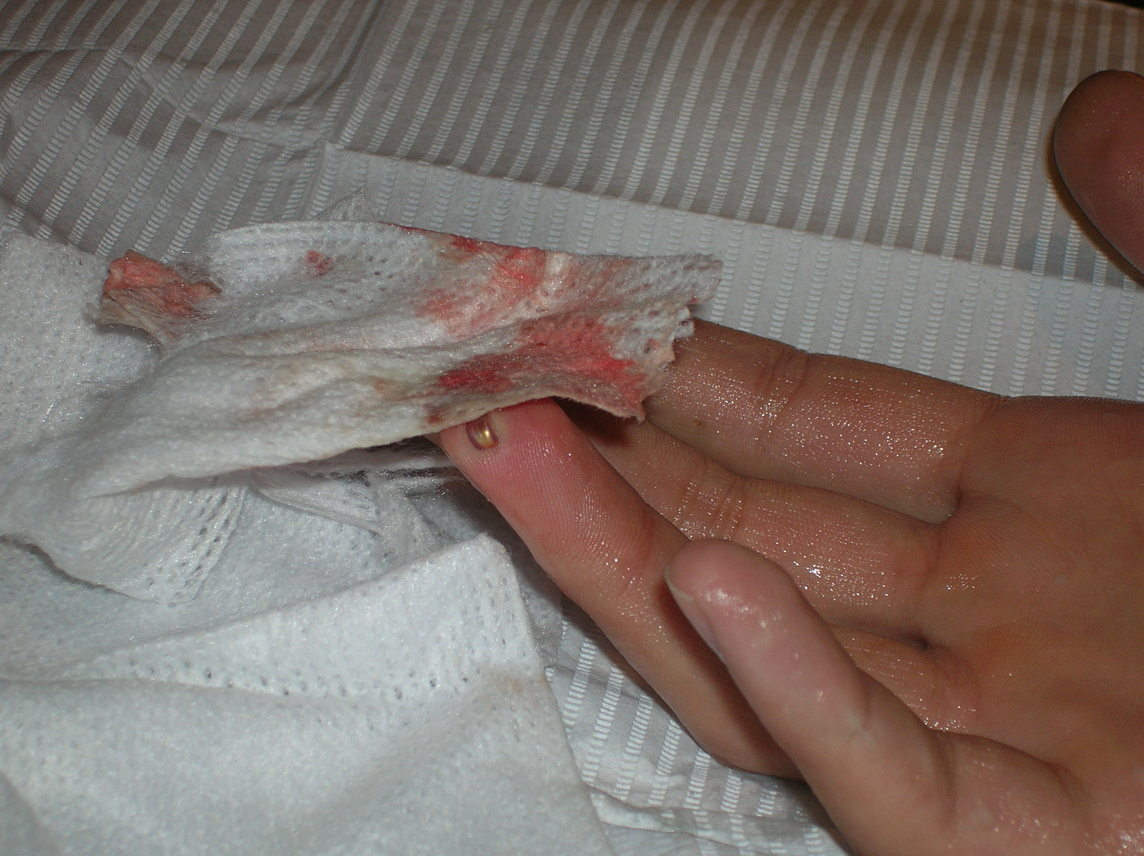
A magnet in the process of insertion into the tip of the ring finger

The magnets used for implantation must be carefully selected and coated in order to successfully implant them. Size is important in this consideration, as too large of a magnet obstructs blood vessels and is likely to reject, or push out of the skin. For this reason, the most common magnet size is a 3×1mm neodymium disk magnet. Usually the magnets used are of the highest strength available, as a stronger magnet leads to higher magnetic field sensitivity. Perhaps the most important consideration is a coating for the magnet, as typical neodymium disk magnets are not suitable for implantation. Magnets must be coated in an inert and biosafe material, so the body does not attack the magnet. Popular magnet coatings include implant grade silicone, parylene, titanium nitride, gold and rhodium. Disc-magnets are implanted with a scalpel, tubes are inserted by scalpel or syringe. Procedures are often done either without anaesthesia, or, in some cases, ice water, due to legal issues regarding purchase of anaesthesia versus usage of numbing substances such as alcohol or cold.

== History ==
Magnet implantation was first theorized in the mid 1990s by Steve Haworth and Jesse Jarrel, both body modification experts. Initially, the implants were designed to connect to rings or horns outside of the body, and were purely cosmetic. However, after talking to a friend who had a piece of steel lodged into his finger which allowed him to sense the presence of magnetic fields, Haworth realised that small magnets could be implanted in order to achieve this effect more efficiently. Since then, several companies, such as Dangerous Things have sold bio-safe, implantable magnets.

== Lifespan ==
Typical 3×1mm neodymium magnets have been reported to last on average five years implanted into finger extremities before the effectiveness of the implant becomes reduced. There have been no studies on magnetizing implants after they have lost magnetization other than removing and re-implanting a new magnet into a new site due to scar tissue formation preventing nerve sensation and reentry.

== Safety ==
Infection has also been cited as a source of failure within RFID and related microchip implanted individuals. Either due to improper implantation techniques, implant rejections or corrosion of implant elements.

Magnets and ferrous materials, including implants, are not allowed in proximity of MRI machines, because of the extreme magnetic force.

== In popular culture ==
Transhumanism is a movement to upgrade the human body with technology. This includes simple implants like magnets, as well as more advanced cybernetics and robotic limbs.
