= Tim Cannon =

American software developer

- Born: September 11, 1979 (age 46); Camden, Ohio, United States
- Occupation: CIO of Grindhouse Wetware
- Known for: Biohacking

Tim Cannon is an American software developer, entrepreneur, and biohacker based in Pittsburgh, Pennsylvania. He is best known as Chief Information Officer of Grindhouse Wetware, a biotechnology startup company that creates technology to augment human capabilities. Grindhouse was co-founded by Cannon and Shawn Sarver in 2012. Cannon himself has had a variety of body modification implants, and has been referred to in the media as a cyborg.

Cannon has spoken at conferences around the world on the topics of human enhancement, futurism, and citizen science, including at TEDx Rosslyn, FITUR, the University of Maryland, the World Business Dialogue, the Medical Entrepreneur Startup Hospital, and others. He has been published in Wired and featured in television shows such as National Geographic Channel's The Big Picture with Kal Penn. Cannon has been featured on podcasts including Ryan O'Shea's Future Grind and Roderick Russell's Remarkably Human.

== Implants ==
Cannon has had a variety of body modification implants, including a radio-frequency identification (RFID) tag in his hand and magnetic implants in a finger, wrist, and tragus, causing him to be labelled a cyborg by media outlets including Business Insider, Newsweek, The Awl, and others. Because of legal and ethical restrictions on the types of surgery that can be done on humans, most of these modifications cannot be done by doctors or anesthetists. Instead they are done by body modification experts or on a "DIY" basis.

In May 2012, inspired by Lepht Anonym, Cannon had finger magnets implanted to give him an "extra sense", the ability to feel electromagnetism.

In October 2013, Cannon became the first person to be implanted with the Grindhouse-designed biometric sensor known as Circadia, a procedure which was performed by body modification artist Steve Haworth in Essen, Germany. The device, approximately the size of a deck of playing cards, automatically sent Cannon's temperature to his phone, was powered wirelessly through inductive charging, and mimicked bioluminescence with subdermal LEDs. After a few months as an initial proof-of-concept test, a series of panic attacks led to the device's removal. Cannon is currently working to design an improved, consumer-friendly version of his Circadia implant that measures additional biometrics such as blood glucose, blood oxygen, blood pressure, and heart rate data.

In November 2015, Tim had a prototype of Grindhouse's Northstar device implanted into his right forearm during a procedure at the “Cyborg Fair” in Düsseldorf, Germany. A little larger than a coin, Northstar contained five LED lights, creating a bioluminescent effect when touched with a magnet (such as the ones implanted in Cannon's fingertips.) Its purpose is solely aesthetic. Capable of blinking around 10,000 times before the battery runs down, the device has been presented as a way to "light" tattoos.
