= Amal Graafstra =

Entrepreneur and biohacker

- Born: 1975 or 1976 (age 49–50)
- Occupations: Founder, Dangerous Things; Founder, VivoKey Technologies
- Known for: Body hacking
- Website: amal.net

Amal Graafstra is a biohacker, author, and microchip implant developer, known for his work on human-implantable RFID/NFC microchips through his companies Dangerous Things and VivoKey Technologies.

Since 2008, Graastra has worked alongside multiple researchers and scientists to develop and produce NFC microchip implants and biohacking procedures.

== Career ==
Graafstra, while working in the basement office of his company Morpheus Inc, came up with the idea to utilize microchips in his everyday life after repeatedly moving items back and forth, requiring the unlocking and relocking of a single door, one that he had often locked himself out of in the past. Graafstra first implanted himself with an RFID chip in 2005, using it to unlock the door to his home. The chip that Graafstra initially implanted in his hand was not NFC-compliant, meaning that it did not conform to NFC Forum standards. After reporting on his own experiences, he responded to others interested in the process. He has previously described himself as an "adventure technologist".

As interest continued to ramp, in 2013, Graafstra founded the company Dangerous Things in Seattle, Washington. The company built the first commercially available implantable NFC-compliant transponder, releasing it for purchase in that same year. According to Graafstra, companies like Apple, Samsung, and Google have bought Dangerous Things products through their corporate purchasing departments. In 2016, Graafstra modified a gun prototype using the same technology, making it so his FN PS90 could only be unlocked by one of his implants. He faced death threats from gun rights activists, who saw Graafstra's invention as a way for the government or other hackers to track their firearms.

In 2017, Graafstra founded the company VivoKey Technologies. In 2018, the company developed the first commercially available cryptographically-secure human implantable NFC transponders.

As of 2019, Graafstra has sold over 100,000 implantable microchips through his companies, having personally installed approximately 5,500 himself.

In 2022, Graafstra appeared on Dr. Phil, arguing against cybersecurity concerns in relation to RFID-microchip implants.

=== Presentations ===
In 2006, Graafstra spoke at Dorkbot, a Seattle-based event, where he focused on the background of his own RFID-chip implants.

In 2010, Graafstra spoke during the International Symposium on Technology and Society held at the University of Wollongong, which focused on "the relationship between humans and technology".

In 2012, Graafstra appeared at Toorcamp, a hacker conference in northwestern Washington State, implanting microchips in participating attendees.

In 2013, Graafstra spoke at a TEDx Talk hosted at Simon Fraser University, basing his talk on the trend of "grinders" (people who have incorporated technology into their bodies).

In 2014, Graafstra set up an "implantation station" at the San Francisco-based Transhuman Visions conference, offering to implant an RFID chip into attendees.

In 2016, Graafstra put on a demonstration of implanted NFC tags and payment chips embedded in the hand at the Deus Ex Mankind Divided Augmented Australia conference, a transhumanism conference that took place in Sydney, Australia. In the same year, Graafstra set up a similar demonstration at CeBIT, implanting microchips for willing participants. He also appeared at a bodyhacking conference in Austin, Texas, which was the first of its kind.

== Bibliography ==
- RFID Toys: Cool Projects for Home, Office, and Entertainment (2006) ISBN 9780471771968

== Personal life ==
Graafstra has implanted an RFID chip in each of his hands. In his left hand, the microchip unlocks his doors, logs into his computer, and starts his motorbike. In his right hand, the chip stores data that can be downloaded or uploaded to a cellular device. Graafstra resides in Washington state.
