= Body hacking =

DIY ethic of body enhancement

Body hacking is the application of the hacker ethic (often in combination with a high risk tolerance) in pursuit of enhancement or change to the body's functions through technological means, such as do-it-yourself cybernetic devices or by introducing biochemicals.

Grinders are a self-identified community of body hackers. Many grinders identify with the biopunk movement, open-source transhumanism, and techno-progressivism. The Grinder movement is strongly associated with the body modification movement and practices actual implantation of cybernetic devices in organic bodies as a method of working towards transhumanism. This includes designing and installing do-it-yourself body enhancements, such as magnetic implants. Biohacking emerged in a growing trend of non-institutional science and technology development.

Biohacking can also refer to managing one's own biology using a combination of medical, nutritional, and electronic techniques. This may include the use of nootropics, nontoxic substances, and/or cybernetic devices for recording biometric data (as in the quantified self movement).

== Ideology ==
Grinders largely identify with transhumanist and biopunk ideologies. Transhumanism is the belief that it is both possible and desirable to so fundamentally alter the human condition through the use of technologies so as to inaugurate a superior post-human being. Kara Platoni categorizes such technological modifications as "hard" biohacking, noting the desire to expand the boundaries of human perception and even create "new senses".

Biopunk is a techno-progressive cultural and intellectual movement that advocates open access to genetic information and espouses the liberating potential of truly democratic technological development. Like other punk movements, biopunk encourages the DIY ethic. "Grinders" adhere to an anarchist strain of biopunk that emphasizes non-hierarchical science and DIY.

Cyborgs and cyborg theory strongly influence techno-progressivism and transhumanism and are thus influential to both the DIY-bio movement and grinder movement in general. Some biohackers, such as grinders and the British professor of cybernetics Kevin Warwick, actively design and implement technologies that are integrated directly into the organic body. Examples of this include DIY magnetic fingertip implants or Warwick's "Project Cyborg". Cyborg theory was kickstarted in 1985 with the publication of Donna Haraway's influential "Cyborg Manifesto" but can be traced back all the way to Manfred Clynes and Nathan Klines' article "Cyborgs and Space". This body of theory criticizes the rigidity of ontological boundaries and attempts to denaturalize artificial dichotomies.

== Notable people ==
- Kevin Warwick is a British scientist and professor of cybernetics who has been instrumental in advancing and popularizing cyborg technology and biohacking through his self-experiments.
- Steve Mann is a professor of electrical and computer engineering who has dedicated his career to inventing, implementing, and researching cyborg technologies, in particular, wearable computing technologies.
- Amal Graafstra is known for implanting an RFID chip in 2005 and developing human-friendly chips, including the first-ever implantable NFC chip. In 2013, he founded the biotech startup company Dangerous Things. He is also the author of RFID Toys and speaker on biohacking topics, including a TEDx talk. He has also built a smartgun that is activated by his implants. He has created an implantable cryptographic processor called VivoKey for personal identity and cryptography applications.
- Lepht Anonym is a biohacker and transhumanist known for self-surgeries and material implementation of transhumanist ideologies.
- Winslow Strong is a mathematician and physicist.
- Tim Cannon is a software developer, entrepreneur, and co-founder of biotech startup company Grindhouse Wetware.
- Jeffrey Tibbetts is the organiser of the Grindfest events at his lab in California. He is the founder of Symbiont Labs, a custom implant fabrication facility and implantation clinic. His work has been featured in a number of sources, such as Gizmodo.
- Alex Smith is a biohacker known for his work developing new implants, such as the Firefly implants. He has spoken at various conferences, including DEFCON, and been featured in a number of news articles.
- Rich Lee is known for implanting headphones in his tragi in 2013, as well as for his work on a vibrating pelvic implant called the Lovetron9000. His biohacking activities were used as a justification to remove his parental custody rights in 2016.
- Brian Hanley is an American microbiologist who became known for being one of the first biohackers to engineer their own DNA using gene therapy for human enhancement and life extension.
- Meow-Ludo Disco Gamma Meow-Meow implanted a microchip used for the Opal card in Sydney, Australia, though he was subsequently fined $220 for failing to comply with existing transit laws. He also ran against Barnaby Joyce in the Division of New England.
- Jo Zayner attempted a full fecal microbiota transplant on herself in February 2016. She is also the founder of the ODIN, a company that delivers DIY-biology and genetic modification kits to consumers.
- Kai Castledine – Founder of UK-based KSEC, one of the largest international distributors of biohacking implants including Dangerous Things and VivoKey. He also helped establish a global network of professional implant providers via the KSEC Cyborg Centers.
- Biohacker Hannes Sjöblad has been experimenting with NFC chip implants since 2015. In his talk at Echappée Voléé 2016 in Paris, Sjöblad said that he has also implanted himself with a chip between his forefinger and thumb and uses it to unlock doors, make payments, unlock his phone, and essentially replace anything that is in his pockets. He has also hosted several "implant parties", where interested parties can get chips implanted.
- Artem Vasilev is a Russian biohacker. In 2018, he opened his own biohacking laboratory, spending more than $2 million, together with partners. Vasilev has been optimizing health and performance for executives and professional athletes, including Olympic medalists.

== Groups and organizations ==
- BioViva, a gene therapy research and development company based in Bainbridge Island, Washington, US
- Grindhouse Wetware, biotechnology startup company based in Pittsburgh, Pennsylvania

== See also ==
- Neurohacking
