= Grindhouse Wetware =

American biotechnology startup company

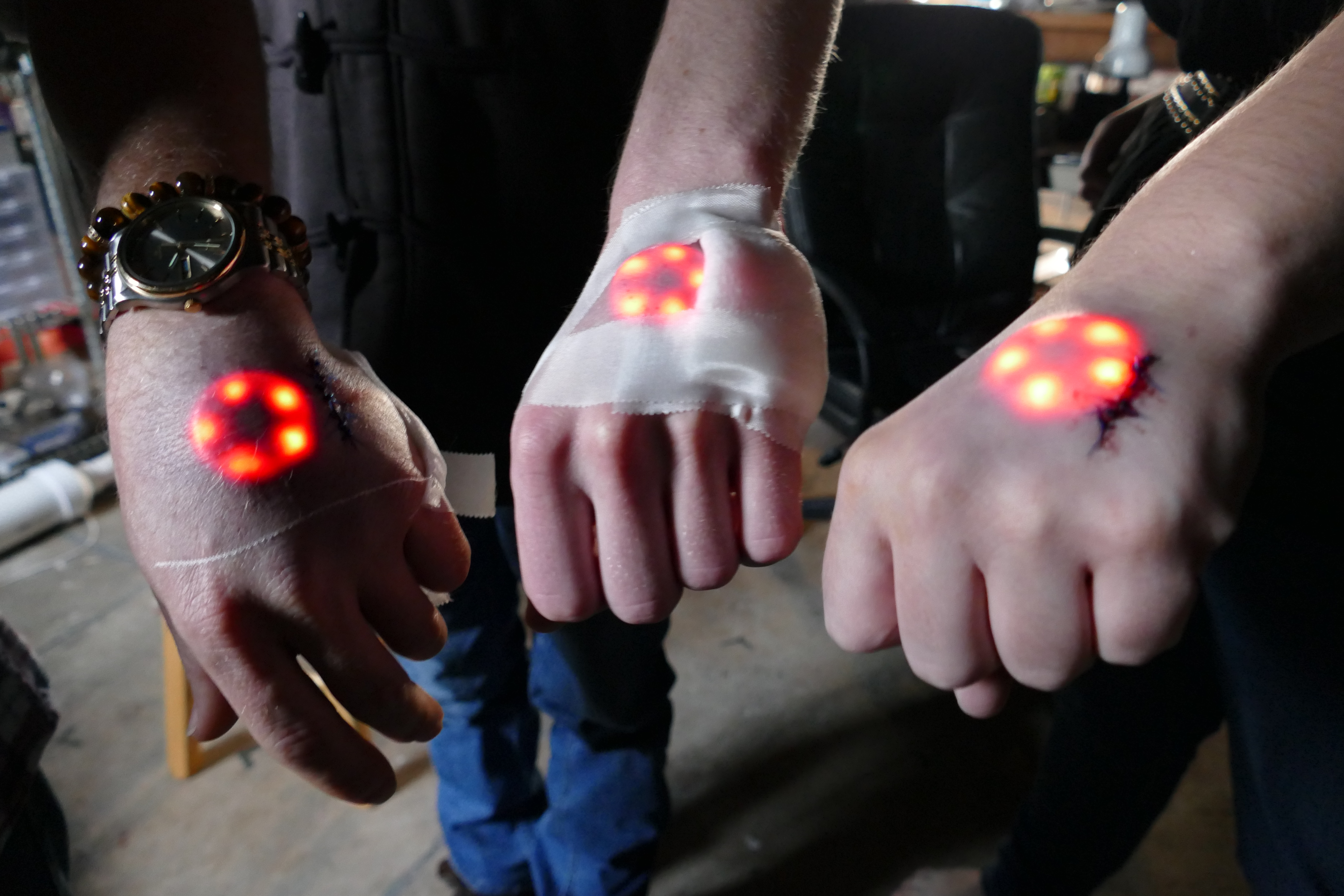
- Photos of Grindhouse Wetware's Northstar Device
- Industry: Biotechnology, Synthetic Biology
- Founded: 2011; 15 years ago
- Founders: Tim Cannon, Shawn Sarver
- Headquarters: Pittsburgh, Pennsylvania, U.S
- Key people: Ryan O'Shea (Spokesman)
- Website: www.grindhousewetware.com

Grindhouse Wetware is an open source biotechnology startup company based in Pittsburgh, Pennsylvania. Grindhouse applies the biohacker ethic to create technology that augments human capabilities. The company is most well known for their Circadia device, a wireless biometric sensor that was implanted into co-founder Tim Cannon on the 22 October 2013. Grindhouse has been featured in television shows such as Taboo on National Geographic Channel, Joe Rogan Questions Everything on Syfy, The Big Picture with Kal Penn, as well as podcasts including Future Grind and Roderick Russell's Remarkably Human.

In November 2015, Grindhouse members Tim Cannon, Shawn Sarver, Justin Worst, Jessica Waldrip, Michael Seeler, and Marlo Webber had prototypes of Grindhouse's Northstar device implanted into their hands during simultaneous procedures occurring at the "Cyborg Fair" in Düsseldorf, Germany, and at a studio in Pittsburgh. The implantation procedure was featured in an episode of the MTV documentary series True Life. Also featured in the episode was the public debut of the morse code functionality of Grindhouse's Bottlenose device at the first Pittsburgh Maker Faire.

== Projects ==
- Circadia is an implantable device that sends biometric data wirelessly via Bluetooth to a phone or tablet and is powered through inductive charging. The first ever Circadia implant occurred in October 2013 in Essen, Germany, when body modification artist Steve Haworth implanted the device into Grindhouse co-founder Tim Cannon.
- Northstar is a planned implant which will feature gesture recognition, can detect magnetic north, and mimics bioluminescence with subdermal LEDs.
- Bottlenose is a wearable technology device that uses implanted or haptic magnets as data inputs to transmit information to the user through nerves.
