= Dangerous Things =

American microchip implant company

- Industry: Body hacking
- Founded: 2013; 13 years ago
- Founder: Amal Graafstra
- Headquarters: Seattle, Washington, United States
- Website: dangerousthings.com

Dangerous Things is an American cybernetic microchip biohacking implant retailer formed in 2013 by Amal Graafstra, following a crowdfunding campaign. The company is based in Seattle, Washington.

== Background ==
Dangerous Things was founded in 2013 by Amal Graafstra in Seattle, Washington. The company’s development stemmed from Graafstra’s desire to replace "archaic technology" in 2005, when he implanted himself with a chip in place of using keys to his then-office. Graafstra received e-mails from individuals who wanted to implant themselves, similar to him, spurring the creation of the company. Dangerous Things hosts a discussion forum on its website for users of its products, where members discuss applications, implantation experiences, and related topics.

== History ==
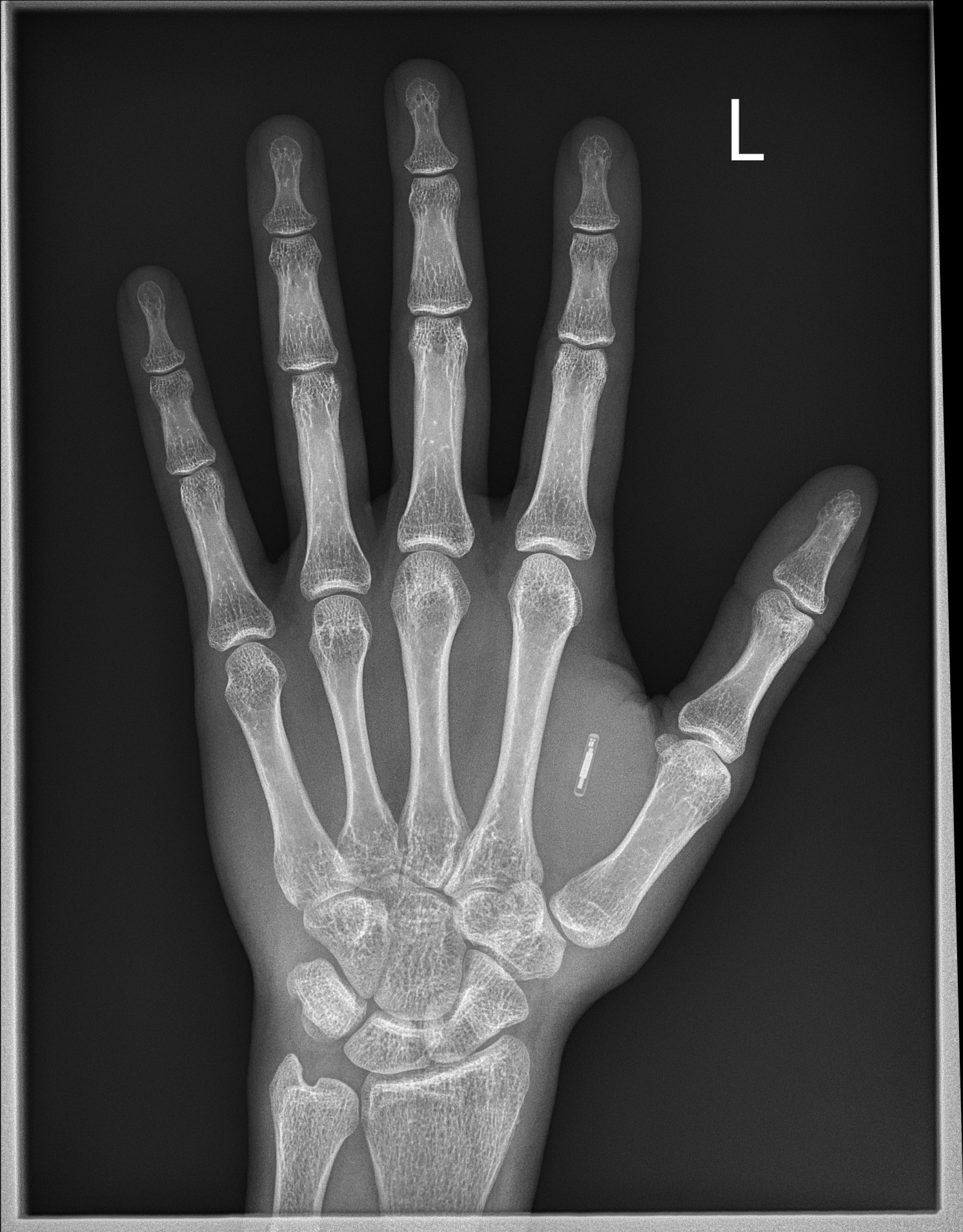
An X-ray image of a Dangerous Things RFID implant in a person's hand.

Dangerous Things produced the first personal publicly available implantable NFC-compliant transponder marketed for use in humans for radio-frequency identification (RFID) in 2013, known as the xNT. The company initially raised funds for the project's mass production on Indiegogo, setting an $8,000 goal. The xNT chip was encased in a 2 mm x 12mm cylindrical bioglass vial and came with a "personal injection system", which was intended to be used by a body modification professional, nurse, doctor, or veterinarian to implant the tag into the hand. According to a 2016 CBS News article, Dangerous Things’ website included a warning stating: "This device has not been tested or certified by any regulatory agency for implementation or use inside the human body. Use of this device is strictly at your own risk."

Dangerous Things’ chip implant sought to replace physical keyfobs and other technologies where NFC was utilized, like passcodes and chip-based payment methods. Chip implants developed by Dangerous Things have also been used to have physical access to cryptocurrency wallets. Individuals who have had the xNT chip implanted, such as video game developer Zoë Quinn, have been referred to as biohackers, cyborgs, or grinders. Through Dangerous Things’ first year in business, the company sold 500 RFID chips.

In 2015, Dangerous Things announced the Switcheroo, a Bluetooth-enabled circuit board designed to interface with existing electronic systems. The company stated that the device could control functions such as door locks, vehicle key fobs, thermostats, and other microcontroller-based devices through a smartphone app. Unlike the company's implantable RFID and NFC products, the Switcheroo was intended as a standalone device that did not require implantation. The project was successfully funded on Kickstarter.

In 2016, Dangerous Things began to shift its focus toward Europe, where sentiment towards biohacking was more positive. During that year, the company announced the UKI, an implantable chip that it described as capable of supporting applications such as cryptocurrency transactions and encrypted communications, while also developing VivoKey, a cryptographic key implant. Dangerous Things founder, Amal Graafstra, would later launch cryptographic technology through its own company, VivoKey Technologies. Through May 2016, according to Dangerous Things, the company had sold over 10,000 RFID chips and DIY installation kits.

According to a 2018 Ars Technica article, Dangerous Things offered several implantable RFID and NFC microchip models with varying memory capacities, programmable features, and security capabilities. Its product line included low-frequency 125 kHz RFID chips for emulating or cloning compatible access credentials, as well as 13.56 MHz NFC-compatible chips with differing storage capacities and support for password protection or Crypto1 security, depending on the model. In that same year, Dangerous Things estimated that approximately 50,000 to 100,000 people had implanted themselves with microchip technologies.

In a 2020 Hour Detroit article, Dangerous Things was reported to offer the xSIID, an NFC implant featuring an integrated LED indicator that illuminates when activated.
