= Microchip implant (animal) =

Implant used in animals

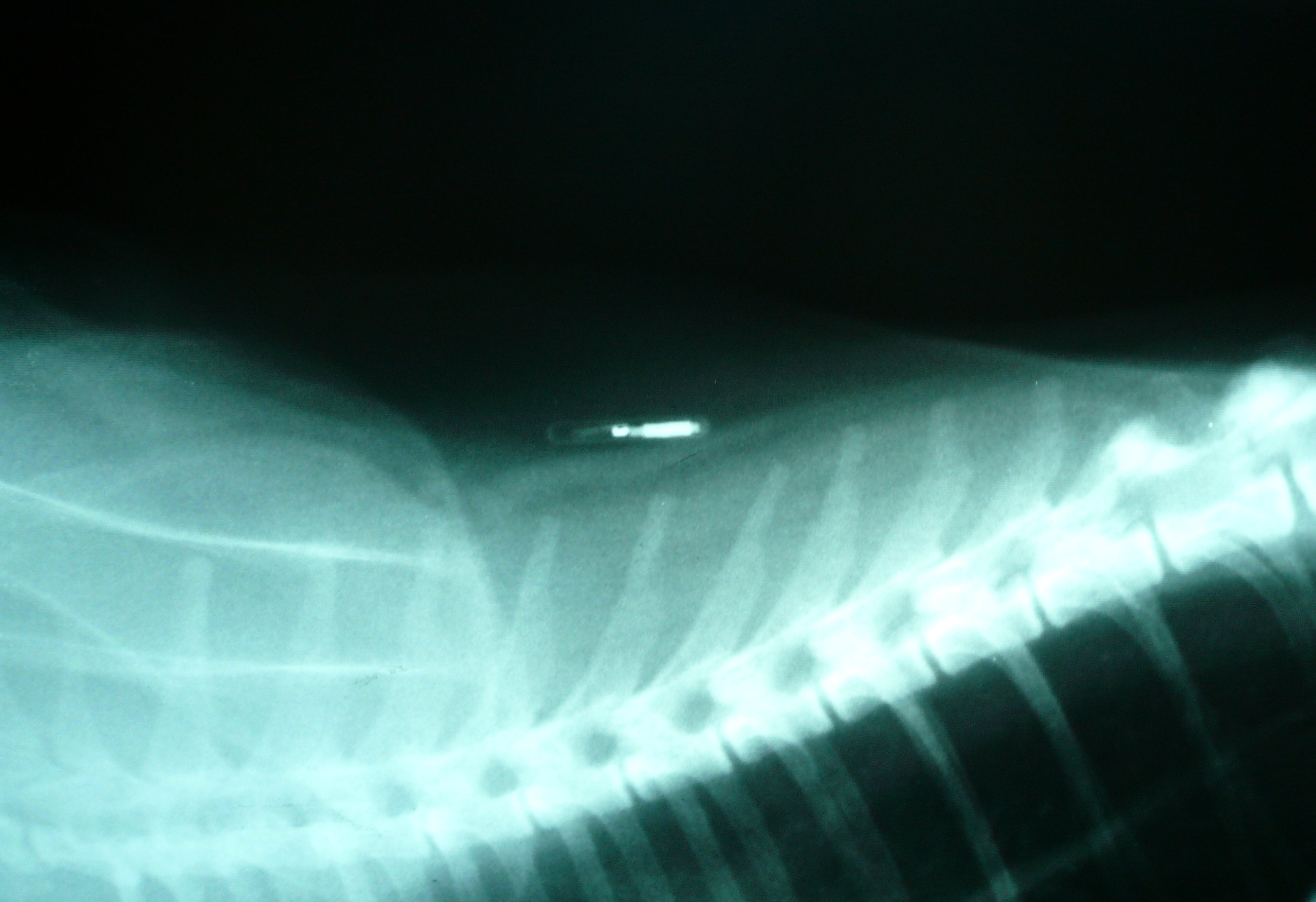
X-ray image of a microchip implant in a cat

A microchip implant is an identifying integrated circuit placed under the skin of an animal. The chip, about the size of a large grain of rice, uses passive radio-frequency identification (RFID) technology, and is also known as a PIT (passive integrated transponder) tag. Standard pet microchips are typically 11–13 mm long (approximately 1/2 inch) and 2 mm in diameter.

Externally attached microchips such as RFID ear tags are commonly used to identify farm and ranch animals, with the exception of horses. Some external microchips can be read with the same scanner used with implanted chips.

Animal shelters, animal control officers and veterinarians routinely look for microchips to return lost pets quickly to their owners, avoiding expenses for housing, food, medical care, outplacing and euthanasia. Many shelters place chips in all outplaced animals.

Microchips are also used by kennels, breeders, brokers, trainers, registries, rescue groups, humane societies, clinics, farms, stables, animal clubs and associations, researchers, and pet stores.

== Usage ==
Since their first use in the mid-1980s, microchips have allowed innovative investigations into numerous biological traits of animals. The tiny, coded markers implanted into individual animals allow assessment of growth rates, movement patterns, and survival patterns for many species in a manner more reliable than traditional approaches of externally marking animals for identification. Microchips have also been used to confirm the identity of pets and protected species that have been illegally removed from the wild.

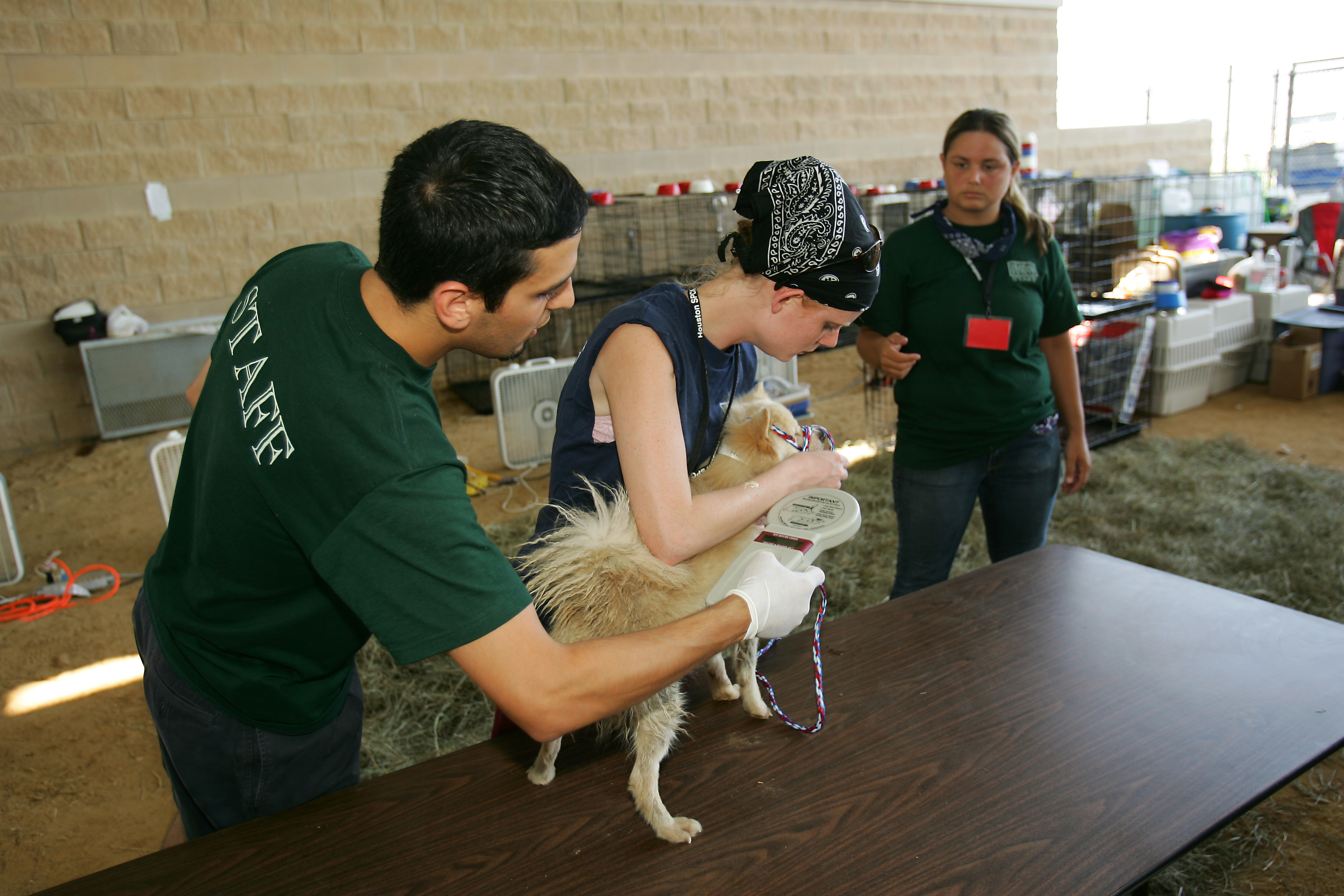
Veterinarians implanting a microchip into a dog

Microchips can be implanted by a veterinarian or at a shelter. After checking that the animal does not already have a chip, the vet or technician injects the chip with a syringe and records the chip's unique ID. No anesthetic is required, as it is a simple procedure and causes little discomfort; the pain is minimal and short-lived. In dogs and cats, chips are usually inserted below the skin at the back of the neck between the shoulder blades on the dorsal midline. According to one reference, continental European pets get the implant in the left side of the neck. The chip can often be felt under the skin. Thin layers of connective tissue form around the implant and hold it in place.

Horses are microchipped on the left side of the neck, halfway between the poll and withers and approximately one inch below the midline of the mane, into the nuchal ligament. Studies on horses show swelling and increased sensitivity take approximately three days to resolve. A test scan ensures correct operation.

Birds are implanted in their breast muscles. Proper restraint is necessary so the operation requires either two people (an avian veterinarian and a veterinary technician) or general anesthesia.

Some shelters and vets designate themselves as the primary contact to remain informed about possible problems with the animals they place. The form is sent to a registry, who may be the chip manufacturer, distributor or an independent entity such as a pet recovery service. Some countries have a single official national database. For a fee, the registry typically provides 24-hour, toll-free telephone service for the life of the pet. Some veterinarians leave registration to the owner, usually done online, but a chip without current contact information is essentially useless.

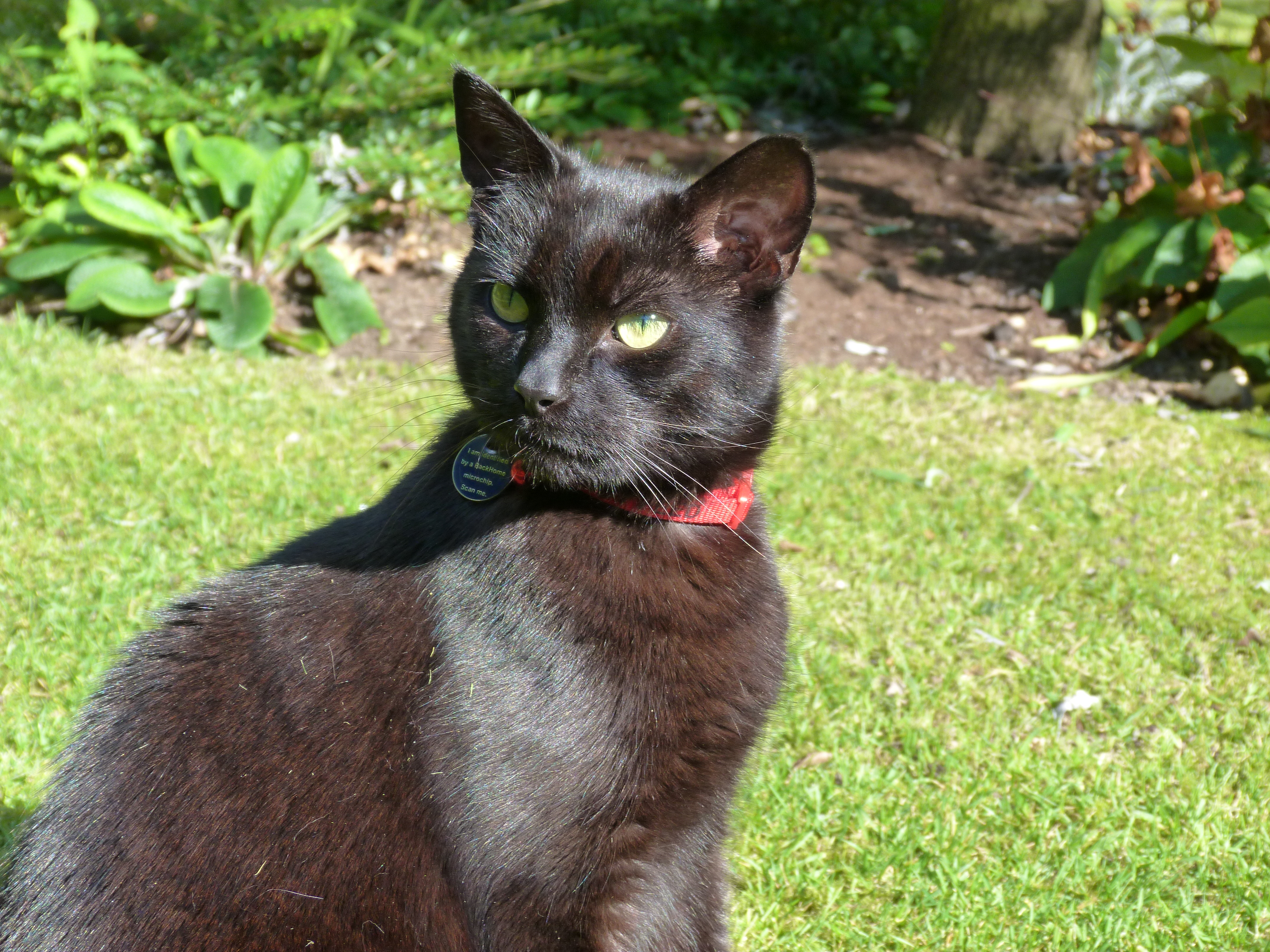
Information about the implant is often imprinted on a collar tag worn by a pet.

The owner receives a registration certificate with the chip ID and recovery service contact information. The information can also be imprinted on a collar tag worn by the animal. Like an automobile title, the certificate serves as proof of ownership and is transferred with the animal when it is sold or traded; an animal without a certificate could be stolen. There are some privacy concerns regarding the use of microchips.

Authorities and shelters examine strays for chips, providing one of the aforementioned recovery services with the ID number, description and location so that the recovery service may notify the owner, a contact, or veterinarians in the area. If the pet is wearing the collar tag, the finder does not need a chip reader to contact the registry because a rescuer can simply read the ID number and phone number (or website) to provide to the registry. An owner can also report a missing pet to the recovery service, as vets look for chips in new animals and check with the recovery service to see if it has been reported lost or stolen.

Many veterinarians scan an animal's chip on every visit to verify correct operation. Some use the chip ID as their database index and print it on receipts, test results, vaccination certifications and other records.

Some veterinary tests and procedures require positive identification of the animal, and a microchip may be acceptable for this purpose as an alternative to a tattoo.

Some pet doors can be programmed to be activated by the microchips of specific animals, allowing only certain animals to use the door.

== Advantages of data collection ==
=== Pets ===
There are multiple reasons for the use of the microchips on pets as a documentation device, which are also advantages of microchips regarding information collection. The three major reasons for microchip implantation are delocalization, recording, domestication and showing proof of ownership. For example, with a feline microchip, delocalization shows that a registered cat is one that society is aware of and the cat has a position in the social order of animals. Recording shows that the microchip helps authorized people review and monitor cats in a certain region by referring to the database; thus the registry and the implanted microchips transform cats into social objects.

=== Livestock ===
Due to the advantages of microchips, there are many concrete applications of RFID in the agri-food sector covering the majority of usual foods, such as all kinds of meats as well as various vegetables, fruits. The feature of RFID, namely its traceability, makes it possible for the increased security and confidence of customers. As one of the most popular livestock around the world, the health condition of pigs is vital to farmer's income and inevitably influence customers' health. It is challenging to monitor the pigs' health condition individually by using traditional approaches. It is common for diseases to spread from a single pig to nearly all the pigs living in the same pigsty. By adopting the technology of microchips to measure the drinking behavior of individual pigs housed in a group, it is possible to identify a pig's health and productivity state. This kind of behavior is a good indicator of a pig's overall health. Compared to traditional visual observations to determine the pig's health state, RFID-based monitoring of pig drinking behavior is a feasible and more efficient option.

=== Wildlife ===
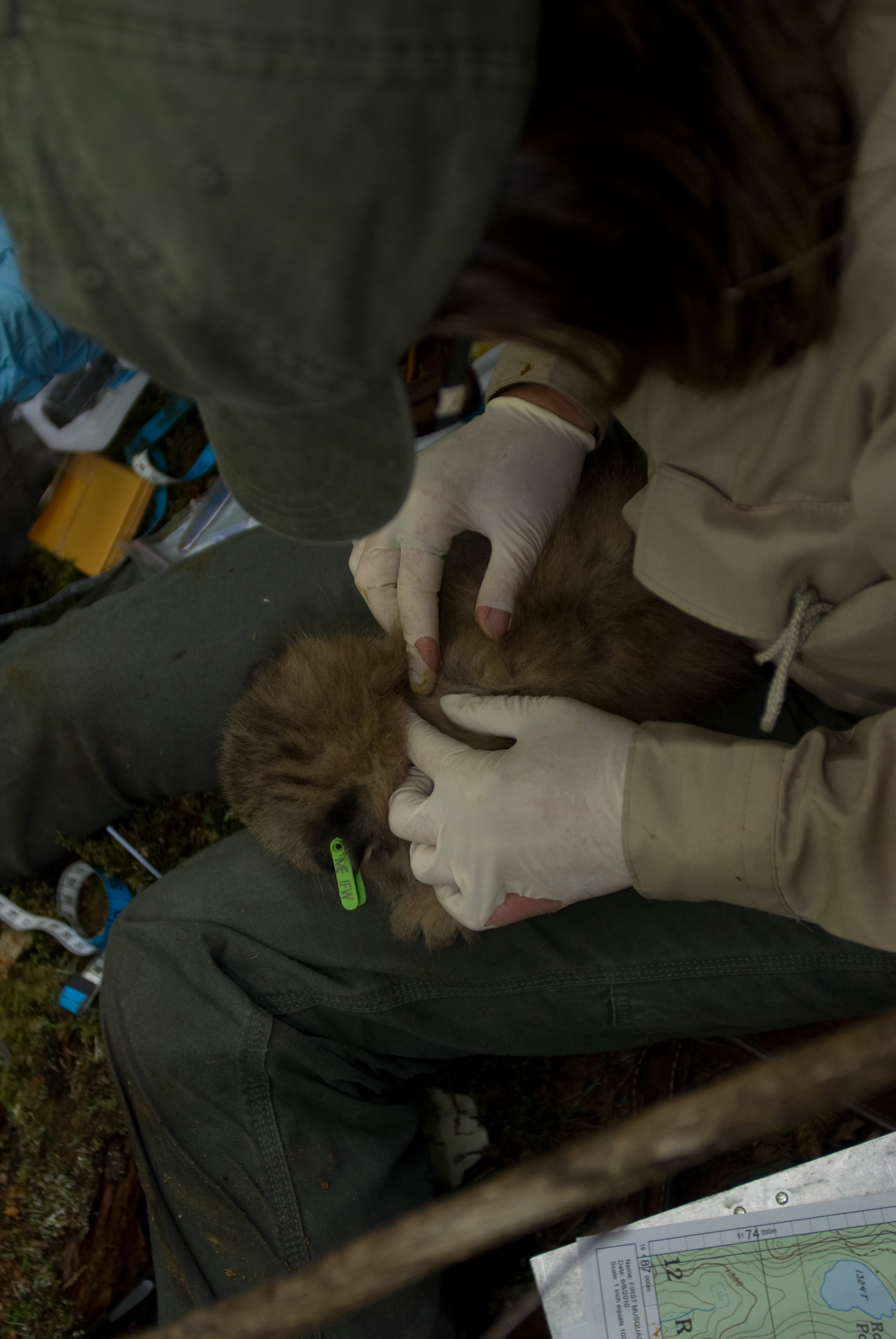
A wildlife biologist is implanting a microchip into a lynx kitten for future recollection of this lynx's habitat and behavior.

Using microchips in wild animals in biology began with fisheries' studies to determine the efficacy of this method for measuring fish movement. Later, studies that use microchips to track wild animals expanded over the years, including researches on mammals, reptiles, birds, and amphibians. Compared with previous marking and tagging techniques used to identify wild animals before the advent of microchips, such as ear tags and color-coded leg bands, microchips are visually less obvious and less likely to be detected by prey and predators. Due to the fact that traditional identifications are on the exterior of the animal, tags can be lost, scars can heal and tattoos can fade.

Other useful and significant information can be collected by microchips. Chipped wild animals that are recaptured can provide information on growth rate and change of location, as well as other valuable data such as age structure, sex ratios, and longevity of individuals in the wild. Other researches on small mammals like rats and mice also adopt this technology to determine body temperature of terminally ill animals. As microchips are internal, permanent, durable under harsh environments, and have little influence on animals, more scholars have employed microchip implantation to collect useful data on wildlife researches.

== Components of a microchip ==
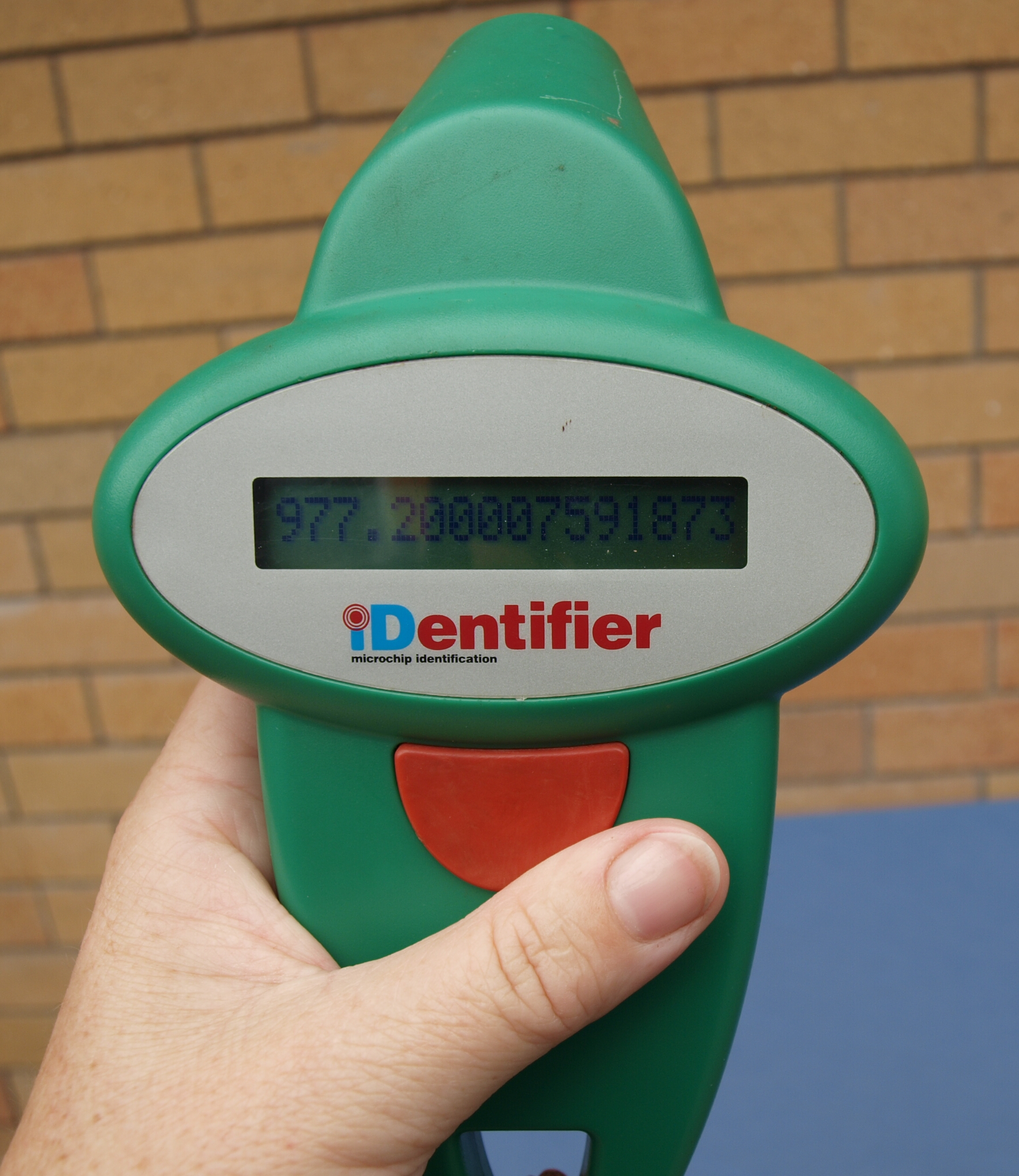
Example of an RFID scanner used with animal microchip implants

A microchip implant is a passive RFID device. Lacking an internal power source, it remains inert until it is powered by the scanner or another power source. While the chip itself only interacts with limited frequencies, the device also has an antenna that is optimized for a specific frequency, but is not selective. It may receive, generate current with, and reradiate stray electromagnetic waves. The radio-waves emitted by the scanner activate the chip, making the chip transmit the identification number to the scanner, and the scanner displays the number on screen. The microchip is enclosed in a biocompatible glass cylinder and includes an identifying integrated circuit placed under the skin of an animal. Relevant standards for the chips are ISO 11784 and ISO 11785.

Most implants contain three elements: a 'chip' or integrated circuit, a coil inductor, possibly with a ferrite core, and a capacitor. The chip contains unique identification data and electronic circuits to encode that information. The coil acts as the secondary winding of a transformer, receiving power inductively coupled to it from the scanner. The coil and capacitor together form a resonant LC circuit tuned to the frequency of the scanner's oscillating magnetic field to produce power for the chip. The chip then transmits its data back through the coil to the scanner. The way the chip communicates with the scanner is a method called backscatter. It becomes part of the electromagnetic field and modulates it in a manner that communicates the ID number to the scanner.

These components are encased in biocompatible soda lime or borosilicate glass and hermetically sealed. Leaded glass should not be used for pet microchips and consumers should only accept microchips from reliable sources. The glass is also sometimes coated with polymers. Parylene C (chlorinated poly-dimethylbenzene) has become a common coating. Plastic pet microchips have been registered in the international registry since 2012 under Datamars manufacturer code 981 and are being implanted in pets. The patent suggests it is a silicone filled polyester sheath, but the manufacturer does not disclose the exact composition.

== Use by country ==
Some countries require microchips in imported animals to match vaccination records. Microchip tagging may also be required for CITES-regulated international trade in certain endangered animals: for example, Asian Arowana are tagged to limit import to captive-bred fish. Birds that are not banded and cross international borders as pets or for trade are microchipped so that each bird is uniquely identifiable.

=== Australia ===
Microchips are legally required in the state of New South Wales, Australia.

Because the ability to trace livestock from property of birth to slaughter is critical to the safety of red meat, the Australian red meat industry has implemented a national system known as National Livestock Identification System to ensure the quality and safety of beef, lamb, sheep meat and goat meat. There are weaknesses in the current microchipping system in Australia. According to several pieces of researches in 2015, reclaim rates were significantly higher for animals with microchips than those without microchips, which is based on the statistical analysis of the raw data of dogs and cats living in Australia as well as microchipped animals. To determine the character and the frequency of inaccurate microchip data used for locating owners of stray pets, the researchers also analyzed admission data for stray dogs and cats entering shelters called RSPCA-Queensland (QLD). The results show that the problem of microchip data may reduce the possibility that a pet's owner will be contacted to reclaim the animal. It is necessary that the current microchipping system in Australia be perfect and that microchip owners update their data frequently.

=== France ===
Since 1999, all dogs older than four months must be permanently identified with a microchip (or a tattoo, though the latter is not accepted if the animal is to leave the country).

Cats are not required to be microchipped, though 2019 recorded increased support for mandatory chipping. Instead, since 1 January 2012, all cats older than seven months require mandatory registration in the European Union database.

=== Israel ===
Dogs and cats imported to Israel are required to be microchipped with an ISO 11784/11785 compliant 15 digit pet microchip.

=== Japan ===
Japan requires an ISO 11784 and 11785 compliant microchip implant for dogs and cats handled by breeders and pet shops, as well as for all imported dogs and cats. Additionally, microchipping is mandatory for certain invasive species that threaten Japan’s ecosystems or agriculture, as well as for special animals classified as dangerous to human life, health, or property.

The Act on Welfare and Management of Animals (Act No. 105 of 1973) requires owners and pet sellers to register microchipped dogs and cats with the Ministry of the Environment database and update registration details as needed. When transferring ownership of a registered dog or cat, the Registration Certificate must accompany the animal. The Act prohibits microchip removal unless it poses a risk to the animal's health or falls under other exceptional cases.

The ISO 11784 standard defines a 15-digit microchip code, split into a 3-digit country code and a 12-digit National ID Code. The Japan Veterinary Medical Association introduced a system in 1995 that includes Japan’s numeric country code (392), followed by a 2-digit animal code, a 2-digit distributor code, and a unique 8-digit identification number.

=== New Zealand ===
All dogs first registered after 1 July 2006 must be microchipped. Farmers protested that farm dogs should be exempt, drawing a parallel to the Dog Tax War of 1898. Farm dogs were exempted from microchipping in an amendment to the legislation passed in June 2006. A National Animal Identification and Tracing scheme in New Zealand is currently being developed for tracking livestock.

=== Portugal ===
In Portugal, the identification of companion animals by means of subcutaneous microchip implantation is mandatory and regulated by national legislation. The requirement was introduced progressively: it became mandatory for potentially dangerous dogs in 2003, was later extended to all dogs in 2008, and, with the entry into force of Decree-Law No. 82/2019, it was further expanded to include cats and ferrets.

Under the current legal framework, all dogs, cats, and ferrets must be microchipped and registered in the national database, the Sistema de Informação de Animais de Companhia (SIAC). The microchip contains a unique identification number associated with the animal and its keeper, allowing competent authorities and veterinary services to identify animals and facilitate the return of lost pets.

The measure aims to improve traceability, promote responsible ownership, and reduce the abandonment of animals. Failure to comply with the legal requirements may result in administrative sanctions, including fines.

=== United Kingdom ===
In April 2012, Northern Ireland became the first part of the United Kingdom to require microchipping of individually licensed dogs.

As of 6 April 2016, all dogs in England, Scotland and Wales must be microchipped.

All pet cats in England must be microchipped by 10 June 2024. Owners found not to have microchipped their cat will have 21 days to have one implanted, or may face a fine of up to £500.

=== United States ===
Microchipping of pets and other animals is voluntary except for some legislation mandating microchipping as a means of identifying animals who have been identified as being dangerous. Though, California law requires any animal control agency, shelter or rescue to only release a cat or dog, including to the owner, if they are microchipped or will be within 30 days. In 1994, the Louisiana Department of Agriculture and Forestry (LDAF) issued a regulation requiring permanent identification (in the form of a brand, lip tattoo or electronic identification) of all horses tested for equine infectious anemia. According to the LDAF and the state veterinarian, this requirement contributed to better determining the owners of horses displaced during Hurricane Katrina in fall 2005.

The United States uses the National Animal Identification System for farm and ranch animals, which excludes dogs and cats. In most species, except horses, an external eartag is typically used in lieu of an implant microchip. Eartags with microchips or simply stamped with a visible number can be used. Both use ISO fifteen-digit microchip numbers with the U.S. country code of 840.

== Cross-compatibility and standards issues ==
In most countries, pet ID chips adhere to an international standard to promote compatibility between chips and scanners. In the United States, however, three proprietary types of chips compete along with the international standard. Scanners distributed to United States shelters and veterinarians well into 2006 could each read at most three of the four types. Scanners with quad-read capability are now available and are increasingly considered required equipment. Older scanner models will be in use for some time, so United States pet owners must still choose between a chip with good coverage by existing scanners and one compatible with the international standard. The four types include:

- The ISO conformant full-duplex type has the greatest international acceptance. It is common in many countries including Canada and large parts of Europe (since the late 1990s). It is one of two chip protocol types (along with the "half-duplex" type sometimes used in farm and ranch animals) that conform to International Organization for Standardization standards ISO 11784 and ISO 11785. To support international/multivendor application, the three-digit country code can contain an assigned ISO country code or a manufacturer code from 900 to 998 plus its identifying serial number. (Note: For display, typically the three country/manufacturer code digits are followed by twelve digits of the serial number to make a fifteen-digit numeric string.) In the United States, distribution of this type has been controversial. When 24PetWatch.com began distributing them in 2003 (and more famously Banfield Pet Hospitals in 2004) many shelter scanners couldn't read them. At least one Banfield-chipped pet was inadvertently euthanized.
- The Trovan Unique type is another pet chip protocol type in use since 1990 in pets in the United States. Patent problems forced the withdrawal of Trovan's implanter device from United States distribution and they became uncommon in pets in the United States, although Trovan's original registry database "infopet.biz" remained in operation. In early 2007, the American Kennel Club's chip registration service, AKC Companion Animal Recovery Corp, which had been the authorized registry for HomeAgain brand chips made by Destron/Digital Angel, began distributing Trovan chips with a different implanter. These chips are read by the Trovan, HomeAgain (Destron Fearing), Bayer (Black Label), and Avid (MiniTracker 3) readers.
- A third type, sometimes known as FECAVA or Destron, (Note: Curiously, an actual matching descriptive specification from the Federation of European Companion Animal Veterinary Associations, or one from Destron Corporation, remains elusive.) is available under various brand names. These include, in the United States, "Avid Eurochip", the common current 24PetWatch chips, and the original (and still popular) style of HomeAgain chips. (HomeAgain and 24Petwatch can now supply the true ISO chip instead on request.) Chips of this type have ten-digit hexadecimal chip numbers. This "FECAVA" type is readable on a wide variety of scanners in the United States and has been less controversial, although its level of adherence to the ISO standards is sometimes exaggerated in some descriptions. The ISO standard has an annex (appendix) recommending that three older chip types be supported by scanners, including a 35-bit "FECAVA"/"Destron" type. The common Eurochip/HomeAgain chips don't agree perfectly with the annex description, although the differences are sometimes considered minor. (Note: The differences are obvious and easily surmounted by someone trying to make a scanner for a FECAVA chip specimen, so the Annex is still quite useful. (The actual FECAVA frequency-modulated signals are inverted (backwards) from the Annex specification.)) But the ISO standard also makes it clear (Note: This is found in clauses 2 and 6 of ISO 11785; the two actual conformant 64-bit types are described in clauses 6.1 and 6.2.) that only its 64-bit "full-duplex" and "half-duplex" types are "conformant"; even chips (e.g., the Trovan Unique) that match one of the Annex descriptions are not. More visibly, FECAVA cannot support the ISO standard's required country/manufacturer codes. They may be accepted by authorities in many countries where ISO-standard chips are the norm, but not by those requiring literal ISO conformance.
- Finally, there's the AVID brand FriendChip type, which has unique encryption characteristics. Cryptographic features are welcomed by pet rescuers or humane societies that object to outputting an ID number "in the clear" for anyone to read, along with authentication features for detection of counterfeit chips, but the authentication in "FriendChips" has been found lacking and rather easy to spoof to the AVID scanner. Although no authentication encryption is involved, obfuscation requires proprietary information to convert transmitted chip data to its original label ID code. Well into 2006, scanners containing the proprietary decryption were provided to the United States market only by AVID and Destron/Digital Angel; Destron/Digital Angel put the decryption feature in some, but not all, of its scanners, possibly as early as 1996. (For years, its scanners distributed to shelters through HomeAgain usually had full decryption, while many sold to veterinarians would only state that an AVID chip had been found.) Well into 2006, both were resisting calls from consumers and welfare group officials to bring scanners to the United States shelter community combining AVID decryption capability with the ability to read ISO-compliant chips. Some complained that AVID itself had long marketed combination pet scanners compatible with all common pet chips except possibly Trovan outside the United States. By keeping them out of the United States, it could be considered partly culpable in the missed-ISO chips problem others blamed on Banfield. (Note: Few of the petitioners bothered to ask AVID to add Trovan-chip compatibility at that time, as these chips would remain uncommon and obscure until 2007 in the U.S.) In 2006, the European manufacturer Datamars, a supplier of ISO chips used by Banfield and others, gained access to the decryption secrets and began supplying scanners with them to United States customers. This "Black Label" scanner was the first four-standard full-multi pet scanner in the United States market. Later in 2006, Digital Angel announced that it would supply a full-multi scanner in the United States. (Note: In addition to its current scanners with full support for ISO full-duplex chips, and maybe ten years production of earlier scanners with no ISO support, Destron/Digital Angel Corp. is also reported to have made in-between models circa 2006, one that gives a detection indication, but no number for ISO chips, and one model that gives either simple detection or full number readout, depending perhaps on the chip's manufacturer or some other factor. These models may be hard to discern without many specimen chips; upgrades may be available, especially to current customer partners of HomeAgain.) In 2008, Avid introduced the MiniTracker Pro to support Avid, FECAVA, and ISO full-duplex microchips. Trovan also acquired the decryption technology in 2006 or earlier, and now provides it in scanners distributed in the United States by AKC-CAR. (Some are quad-read, but others lack full ISO support.)

Many references in print state that the incompatibilities between different chip types are a matter of "frequency". One may find claims that early ISO adopters in the United States endangered their customers' pets by giving them ISO chips that work at a "different frequency" from the local shelter's scanner, or that the United States government considered forcing an incompatible frequency change. These claims were little challenged by manufacturers and distributors of ISO chips, although later evidence suggests the claims were disinformation. All chips operate at the scanner's frequency. Although ISO chips are optimized for 134.2 kHz, in practice they are readable at 125 kHz and the "125 kHz" chips are readable at 134.2 kHz. Confirmation comes from government filings that indicate the supposed "multi-frequency" scanners now commonly available are really single-frequency scanners operating at 125, 134.2 or 128 kHz. In particular, the United States HomeAgain scanner didn't change excitation frequency when ISO-read capability was added; it's still a single frequency, 125 kHz scanner.

	Expected results for chip type			
Scanner to test	ISO conformant full-duplex chip	AVID encrypted "FriendChip"	Original U.S. HomeAgain, AVID Eurochip, (Note: A mention of a chip type called "AVID Travelchip" has been removed from this heading. It appears that "Travelchip" was actually a trademark not of AVID itself but of a chip distributor, which used it as a blanket term for several different chip types sold in value-added kits- firstly AVID Eurochips, later HomeAgain types both regular and ISO.) or FECAVA	"Trovan Unique" and current AKC CAR chips
Minimal ISO conformant scanner (also must read half duplex chips common in livestock ear tags)	OK	No read	No read	No read
Avid MiniTracker I	No read	OK	OK	No read
Avid MiniTracker Pro	OK	OK	OK	No read
Avid MiniTracker Pro Euro	OK	OK	OK	No read
Avid MiniTracker 3	OK	OK	OK	OK
Various vintages of U.S. HomeAgain "Universal" shelter scanners by Destron/Digital Angel Corp.	No read, detect only, or OK	OK	OK	Possibly all OK
Typical Destron/Digital Angel Corp. U.S. veterinarian's scanner pre-2007	No read	Detect only – no number given	OK	Detect only – no number given
Trovan LID-560-Multi per manufacturer specifications	OK	OK	OK	OK
U.S. Trovan Pocket Scanner per AKC-CAR website	Detect only – no number given	OK	OK	OK
U.S. Trovan ProScan700 per AKC-CAR website	OK	OK	OK	OK
Original 2006 Datamars Black Label scanner	OK	OK	OK	OK (but reliability questioned)
Datamars Black Label scanner "classypets" model	OK	No read or detect only	OK	OK (but reliability questioned)
Banfield-distributed 2004-2005 vintage Datamars scanners	OK	Possibly all detect only	OK	Possibly all OK but reliability questioned (undocumented feature)
Datamars Minimax and Micromax	OK	No read	No read	No read
Typical homemade scanner	OK	OK but extra step required (web-based decryption service)	OK	OK
Microchip ID Systems "Hero" scanner	OK	OK	OK	No read
Microchip ID Systems "Pocket Hero" scanner	OK	No read	No read	No read

For users requiring shelter-grade certainty, this table is not a substitute for testing the scanner with a set of specimen chips. One study cites problems with certain Trovan chips on the Datamars Black Label scanner. In general, the study found none of the tested scanners to read all four standards without some deficiency, but it predates the most recent scanner models.

== Reported adverse reactions ==
Adverse event reporting for animal microchips has been inconsistent. RFID chips are used in animal research, and at least three studies conducted since the 1990s have reported tumors at the site of implantation in laboratory mice and rats. The UK's Veterinary Medicines Directorate (VMD) assumed the task of adverse event reporting for animal microchips there in April 2014. Mandatory adverse event reporting went into effect in the UK in February 2015. The first report was issued for the period of April 2014 through December 2015. Mandatory microchip implant of dogs went into effect in April 2016. Data sets for 2016 through 2018 have become available. Adverse reactions to microchip implants may include infection, rejection, mass and tumor formation or death, but the risk of adverse reactions is very low. Sample sizes, in rodents and dogs in particular, have been small, and so conclusive evidence has been limited.

Noted veterinary associations have responded with continued support for the microchip implant procedures as reasonably safe for cats and dogs, pointing to rates of serious complications on the order of one in a million in the UK, which has a system for tracking such adverse reactions and has chipped over 3.7 million pet dogs. A 2011 study found no safety concerns for microchipped animals with RFID chips undergoing MRI at one Tesla magnetic field strength. In 2011 a microchip-associated fibrosarcoma was reported found in the neck of a 9-year old, neutered-male cat. Histological examination was consistent with postinjection sarcoma, but all prior vaccinations occurred in the hindlegs.

The microchip is implanted in the subcutaneous tissues causing an inflammatory response until scar tissue develops around the microchip. Studies on horses are used as the basis for short inflammatory response claims, while procedures on done on small kittens and puppies. People have reported swelling and bruising at the time of the implant with itching and pinching sensations for up to two years. The broader impacts on inflammatory disorders and cancer have not been determined and most of the health risks that were defined in the FDA Guidance developed for human implants should be considered. Adverse event reporting in the US can be made by the pet owner or a veterinarian to the FDA.

Summary of adverse events
Period	Total	Dog only	Migration	Failure	Reactions
4/2014–12/2015	1,420	1,195	729	630	61
2016	2,063	1,861	876	1,090	97
2017	1,044	843	407	589	53
2018	642	491	241	379	22
Total	5,169	4,390	2,253	2,683	233

The estimate for the total cat and dog population of the UK is 16 million with 8.5 million dogs subject to mandatory microchip implant. The population of dogs implanted prior to mandatory adverse event reporting February 2015 was between 60% (February 2013) and 86% (April 2016). Approximately 95% are reported to be implanted as of April 2017.

== Privacy ==
Unauthorized reading of microchips can present a risk to privacy and can potentially provide information to identify the owners of animals.

A common misconception is that the chip can be used for location tracking of the animal, which is false.

=== The microchip ownership question ===
The widespread adoption of microchip identification may lead to ownership disputes occurring more frequently since sometimes microchip ownership information is irrelevant according to the ownership laws. This can occur when the owner is not the one to whom the microchip ownership information belongs. This is a significant problem because client confidentiality rules generally prohibit veterinarians from divulging information about a pet without the client's permission. Furthermore, veterinarians are required to get permission from the person who registered the chip to perform a surgery on a microchipped animal, even if the animal is experiencing a severe medical emergency. The problem can be more complicated if animals with microchips are abandoned or stolen.

=== Protecting privacy ===
The first method of protecting microchip privacy is by regularly updating information. Stray animals with incorrect microchip details are less likely to be reclaimed and when compared to pets with correct microchip details, the time taken to retrieve the pets is longer, and sometimes reuniting is impossible. Therefore, it is wise to update microchip information regularly, especially when owners move or change their phone numbers. According to research, email reminders may increase the frequency of pet owners updating their microchip information. By increasing the pet owners' updating frequency of the pets' data, the reclaim percentages of stray animals will increase and reduce the number of pets euthanized in shelters every year.

Another method of protection is by using cryptography. Rolling codes and challenge–response authentication (CRA) are commonly used to foil monitor-repetition of the messages between the tag and reader; as any messages that have been recorded would prove to be unsuccessful on repeat transmission. It is possible that some novel RFID authentication protocols for microchip ownership transfer can be adapted to protect users' privacy, which meets three key requirements for secure microchip ownership transfer. The three requirements include: new owner privacy (only the new owner should be able to identify and control the microchip), old owner privacy (past interactions between the microchip and its previous owner should not be traceable by the new owner) as well as authorization recovery (the new owner should be able to transfer its authorization rights to the previous owner in some special cases). These features can protect owners' privacy to some extent.

== Manufacturers and registers ==
In the United States, the history of some tag manufacturers dates back more than 30 years. Several of the major tag manufacturers are listed below:

- AVID, Inc. (American Veterinary Identification Devices): www.avidid.com; Norco, California
- Biomark, Inc.: www.biomark.com; Meridian, Idaho
- Bio Medic Data Systems, Inc.: www.bmds.com; Seaford, Delaware
- Digital Angel Corporation (formerly Destron Fearing, Inc.): www.destronfearing.com; St.Paul, Minnesota
- Trovan, Ltd.: www.trovan.com; Santa Barbara, California

Some RFID-USA Registers includes:

- Home Again
- Pawbase
- AVID
- AKC Reunite (formerly AKC Companion Animal Recovery [CAR])
- Digital Angel
- ResQ
- ALLFLEX
- Schering Plough
- 24 PET WATCH
- Lifechip
- Banfield
- Crystal Tag
- Datamars
- Destron Fearing

== See also ==
- Microchip implant (human)
- PositiveID
- Proximity card
- Pet recovery service
- Remote-controlled animal
- Radio-frequency identification
- Clipped tag
- Consumer privacy
- ISO 11784 and ISO 11785
