= Glossary of bird terms =

External anatomy (topography) of a typical bird: 1 beak, 2 head, 3 iris, 4 pupil, 5 mantle, 6 lesser coverts, 7 scapulars, 8 coverts, 9 tertials, 10 rump, 11 primaries, 12 vent, 13 thigh, 14 tibio-tarsal articulation, 15 tarsus, 16 feet, 17 tibia, 18 belly, 19 flanks, 20 breast, 21 throat, 22 chin, 23 eyestripe

The following is a glossary of common English language terms used in the description of birds—warm-blooded vertebrates of the class Aves and the only living dinosaurs. Birds, who have feathers and the ability to fly (except for the approximately 60 extant species of flightless birds), are toothless, have beaked jaws, lay hard-shelled eggs, and have a high metabolic rate, a four-chambered heart, and a strong yet lightweight skeleton.

Among other details such as size, proportions and shape, terms defining bird features developed and are used to describe features unique to the class—especially evolutionary adaptations that developed to aid flight. There are, for example, numerous terms describing the complex structural makeup of feathers (e.g., barbules, rachides and vanes); types of feathers (e.g., filoplume, pennaceous and plumulaceous feathers); and their growth and loss (e.g., colour morph, nuptial plumage and pterylosis).

There are thousands of terms that are unique to the study of birds. This glossary makes no attempt to cover them all, concentrating on terms that might be found across descriptions of multiple bird species by bird enthusiasts and ornithologists. Though words that are not unique to birds are also covered, such as "back" or "belly", they are defined in relation to other unique features of external bird anatomy, sometimes called "topography". As a rule, this glossary does not contain individual entries on any of the approximately 11,000 recognised living individual bird species of the world. (Note: Ornithologists from the American Museum of Natural History suggested in a 2016 article published in PLOS ONE, that the use of the "biological species concept"—classifying a grouping of birds as making up a single species by their ability to breed—is outdated and should be discarded in favour of a species' model that looks to similarity and dissimilarity in characteristics such as plumage, pattern and colouring to individuate bird species. Under such a model, it is suggested that there are ±18,000 individual living bird species in the world as of 2016.)

== A ==
addled eggs
Also, wind eggs; hypanema. Eggs that are not viable and will not hatch. See related: overbrooding.
adult plumage
Adult plumage sufficiently developed and fixed following the juvenile and immature years such that it no longer changes significantly in appearance with further increasing age.
afterfeather
Any structure projecting from the shaft of the feather at the rim of the superior umbilicus (at the base of the vanes), but typically a small area of downy barbs growing in rows or as tufts. (Note: Emus and cassowaries are an exception in that their afterfeathers are neither downy nor diminutive in relation to the vanes, but are comparable in size to them; such feathers are thus sometimes referred to as being "double plumed". The feathers of ostrich and rhea, also flightless birds, are by contrast "soft and filmy" in makeup, lacking any barbules to add the stiffness needed in working flight feathers.) Entirely absent in some birds—notably from many members of the Columbidae family (pigeons and doves)—afterfeathers can significantly increase the insulative attributes of a bird's plumage.
allopreening
A form of social grooming among birds, in which one bird preens another or a pair does so mutually. At times it may be used to redirect or sublimate aggression, such as one bird assuming a solicitation posture to indicate its non-aggression and invite allopreening by the aggressive individual.
alternate plumage
See breeding plumage.
altricial
Also defined: semi-altricial; altricial-precocial spectrum. Young that, at hatching, have their eyes closed; are naked or only sparsely covered in down feathers (psilopaedic); are not fully able to regulate their body temperature (ectothermic); and are unable to walk or leave the nest for an extended period of time to join their parents in foraging activities (nidicolous), whom they rely on for food. The contrasting state is precocial young, which are born more or less with their eyes open, covered in down, homeothermic, able to leave the nest and ambulate and to participate in foraging. The young of many bird species do not precisely fit into either the precocial or altricial category, having some aspects of each and thus fall somewhere on an altricial-precocial spectrum. A defined intermediate state is termed semi-altricial, typified by young that, though born covered in down (ptilopaedic), are unable to leave the nest or walk and are reliant on their parents for food.

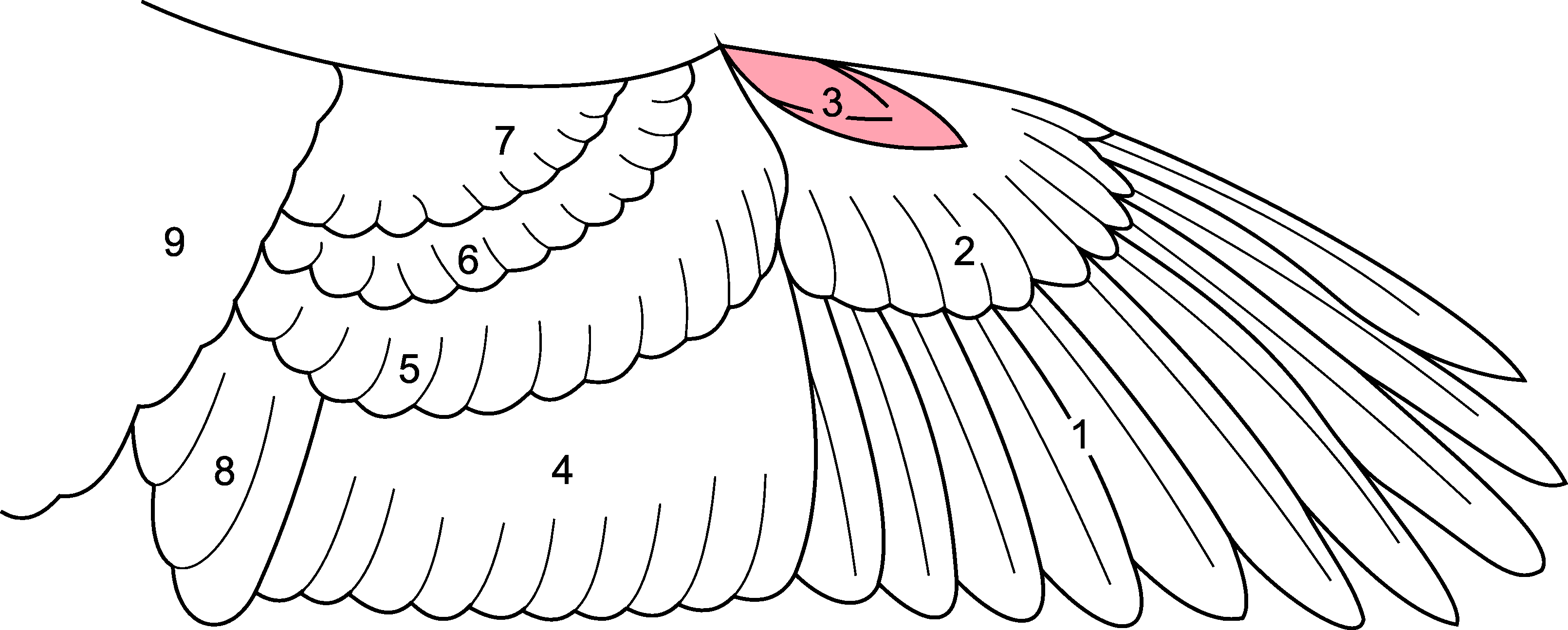
Location of the alula on a bird's wing

alula
Also, bastard wing; alular digit; alular quills. A small, freely-moving projection on the anterior edge of the wing of modern birds (and a few non-avian dinosaurs)—a bird's "thumb"—the word is Latin and means 'winglet'; it is the diminutive of ala, meaning 'wing'. Alula typically bear three to five small flight feathers, with the exact number depending on the species. The bastard wing normally lies flush against the anterior edge of the wing proper, but can be raised to function in similar manner to the slats of airplane wings that aid in lift by allowing a higher than normal angle of attack. By manipulating the alula structure to create a gap between it and the rest of the wing, a bird can avoid stalling when flying at low speeds or when landing. Feathers on the alular digit are not generally considered to be flight feathers in the strict sense; though they are asymmetrical, they lack the length and stiffness of most true flight feathers. Nevertheless, alula feathers are a distinct aid to slow flight.
anisodactylous
Descriptive of tetradactyl (four-toed) birds in which the architecture of the foot consists of three toes projecting forward and one toe projecting backward (the hallux), such as in most passerine species.
anting
Also defined: passive anting. A self-anointing behaviour during which birds rub insects, usually ants and sometimes millipedes, on their feathers and skin. Anting birds may pick up the insects in their bill and rub them on their bodies, or may simply lie in an area with a high density of the insects and perform dust bathing-like movements. Insects used for anting secrete chemical liquids such as formic acid, which can act as insecticides, miticides, fungicides and bactericides. The practice may also act to supplement a bird's own preen oil. A third purpose may be to render the insects more palatable, by causing removal of distasteful compounds. More than 200 species of bird are known to ant. "Passive anting" refers to when birds simply position themselves so as to allow insects to crawl through their plumage.

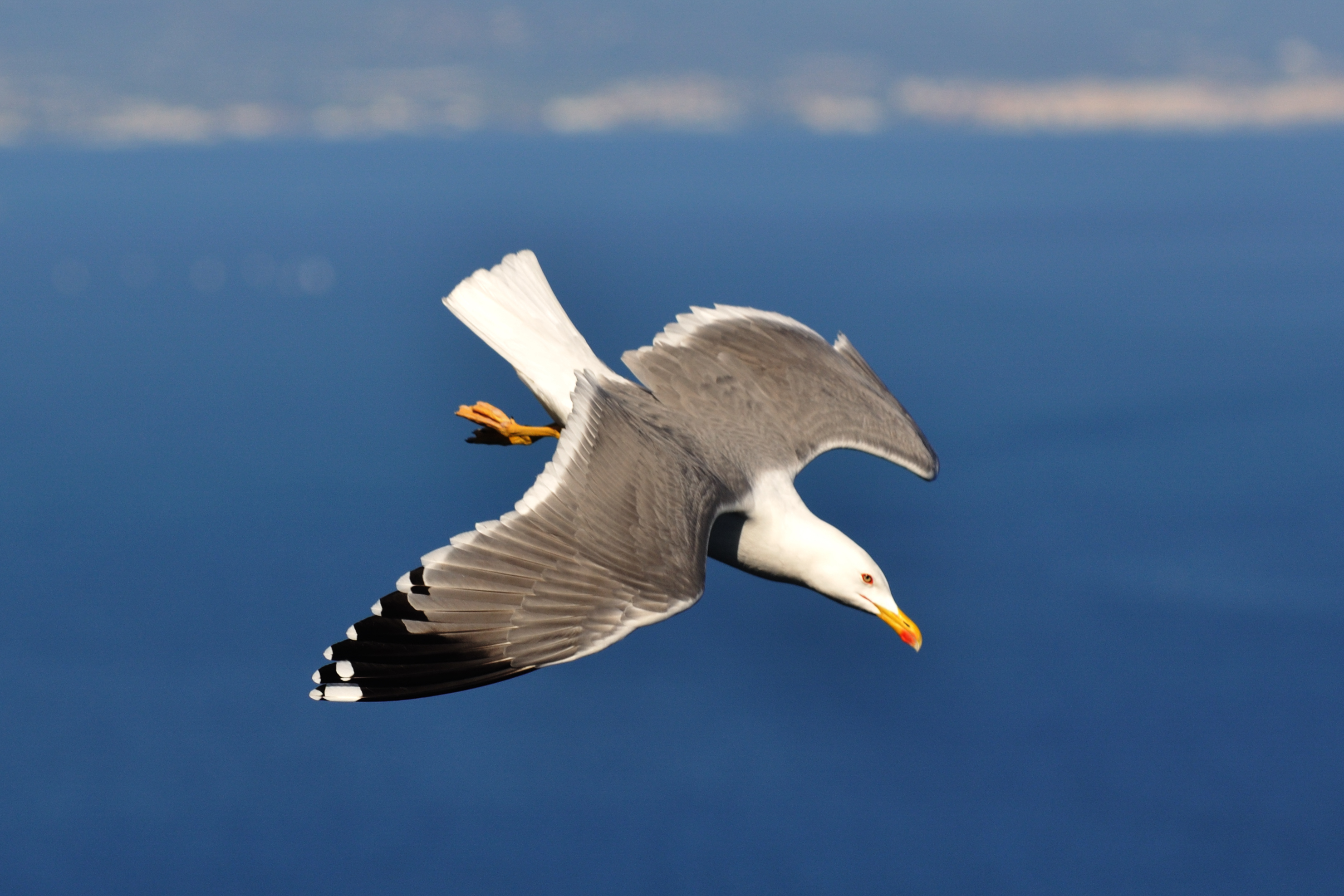
A yellow-legged gull (Larus michahellis) in flight. Apical spots tinge the row of feathers on the trailing edges of its wings.

apical spot
A visible spot near the outer tip of a feather.
apterylae
Singular: apteryla. Also, apteria. Regions of a bird's skin, between the pterylae (feather tracts), which are free of contour feathers; filoplumes and down may grow in these areas. See related: pterylosis.
aviculture
The captive breeding and keeping of birds.
axilla
Also, axillar region; "underarm"; "armpit". The "armpit" of a bird, often hosting covert feathers called axillaries.
axillaries
Also, axillary feathers; lower humeral coverts; hypopteron. Covert feathers found in the axillar region or "armpit" of a bird, which are typically long, stiff and white in colour.

== B ==
Explanatory diagram showing the interlocking of the barbs of feathers

back
The exterior region of a bird's upper parts between the mantle and the rump.
barb
Also defined: ramus (plural: rami). The individual structures growing out of the shaft that collectively make up the vanes of the feathers, more or less interconnected by the hooklets of the barbules, extending from each side of the distal part of the feather's shaft known as the rachis. The central axis of a barb is known as the ramus.
barbules
Also, radius / radii; tertiary fibres. Also defined: proximal barbules; distal barbules; barbicels; hooklets (hamuli); pennulum; teeth. Just as barbs branch off on parallel sides of the rachis, the barbs in turn have a set of structures called barbules, branching from each side of the ramus. The base cells of the barbule form a plate from which a thinner stalk projects called the pennulum. At one more level of branching, the pennulum hosts small outgrowths from it called barbicels—which when found on pennaceous feathers, vary in structure depending on which side of a barb's ramus they project from. Proximal barbules (on the proximal side of the ramus) have ventral projections near the base called teeth, while growing from the pennulum are cilia—simple pointed structures. At the base of the proximal barbule, the "dorsal edge is recurved into a flange". The distal barbules (on the distal side of the ramus) have a thicker base with more elaborate teeth, and a longer pennulum with hooklets (also called hamuli) at the end, as well as cilia in greater number than on proximal barbules. The hooklets overlap one to four rows of proximal barbules on the next higher barb, locking into their flanges, thereby giving the vane structure, strength, flexibility and stability. See also: friction barbules.
basic plumage
See winter plumage.

Comparison of bird bills, displaying different shapes adapted to different feeding methods (not to scale)

beak
Also, bill or rostrum. An external anatomical structure of a bird's head, roughly corresponding with the "nose" of a mammal, that is used for eating, grooming, manipulating objects, killing prey, fighting, probing for food, courtship and feeding young. Although beaks vary significantly in size and shape from species to species, their underlying structures follow a similar pattern. All beaks are composed of two jaws, generally known as the upper mandible (or maxilla) and lower mandible (or mandible), covered with a thin, horny sheath of keratin called the rhamphotheca, which can be subdivided into the rhinotheca of the upper mandible and the gnathotheca of the lower mandible. The tomia (singular: tomium) are the cutting edges of the two mandibles. Most species of birds have external nares (nostrils) located somewhere on their beak—two holes—circular, oval or slit-like in shape—which lead to the nasal cavities within the bird's skull, and thus to the rest of the respiratory system. Although the word beak was, in the past, generally restricted to describing the sharpened bills of birds of prey, in modern ornithology, the terms beak and bill are generally used synonymously.
beak colour
The colour of a bird's beak results from concentrations of pigments—primarily melanins and carotenoids—in the epidermal layers, including the rhamphotheca. In general, beak colour depends on a combination of the bird's hormonal state and diet. Colours are typically brightest as the breeding season approaches and palest after breeding.
beak trimming
Also, debeaking and coping. The partial removal of the beak of poultry, especially layer hens and turkeys, although it may also be performed on quail and ducks. Because the beak is a sensitive organ with many sensory receptors, beak trimming or debeaking is "acutely painful" to the birds it is performed on. It is nonetheless routinely done to intensively farmed bird species because it helps reduce the damage the flocks inflict on themselves due to a number of stress-induced behaviour, including cannibalism, vent pecking and feather pecking. A cauterising blade or infrared beam is used to cut off about half of the upper beak and about a third of the lower beak. Pain and sensitivity can persist for weeks or months after the procedure, and neuromas can form along the cut edges. Food intake typically decreases for some period after the beak is trimmed. However, studies show that trimmed poultry's adrenal glands weigh less, and their plasma corticosterone levels are lower than those found in untrimmed poultry, indicating that they are less stressed overall. A less radical, separate practice, usually performed by an avian veterinarian or an experienced birdkeeper, involves clipping, filing or sanding the beaks of captive birds for health purposes—in order to correct or temporarily alleviate overgrowths or deformities and better allow the bird to go about its normal feeding and preening activities. "Coping" is the name for this practice among raptor keepers.
belly
Also, abdomen. The topographical region of a bird's underparts between the posterior end of the breast and the vent.
billing
Also, nebbing (chiefly UK). Describes the tendency of mated pairs of many bird species to touch or clasp each other's bills. This behaviour appears to strengthen pair bonding. The amount of contact involved varies among species. Some gently touch only a part of their partner's beak while others clash their beaks vigorously together.
bill tip organ
A region found near the tip of the bill in several types of birds that forage particularly by probing. The region has a high density of nerve endings known as the corpuscles of Herbst. These consist of pits in the bill's surface lined with cells that sense pressure changes. The assumption is that these cells allow a bird to perform "remote touch", meaning that it can detect the movement of animals by pressure variations in water, without directly touching the prey. Bird species known to have bill-tip organs include ibises, shorebirds of the family Scolopacidae, and kiwis.

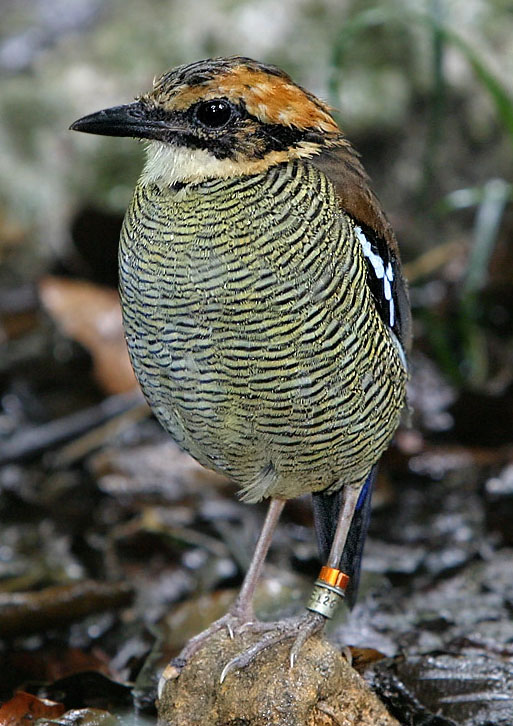
A female Javan banded pitta (Hydrornis guajanus), with a numbered ring on its left leg

bird ringing
Also, bird banding. The attachment of small, individually numbered metal or plastic tags to the legs or wings of wild birds to enable individual identification. The practice helps in keeping track of bird movement and life history. Upon capture for ringing, it is common to take measurements and examine the conditions of feather moult, amount of subcutaneous fat, age indications and sex. The subsequent recapture or recovery of ringed birds can provide information on migration, longevity, mortality, population, territoriality, feeding behaviour and other aspects that are studied by ornithologists. Bird ringing is the term used in Europe, Asia, and Africa, while the term bird banding is more often used in North America and Australia.
bird strike
The impact of a bird or birds with an airplane in flight.
body down
The layer of small, fluffy down feathers that lie underneath the outer contour feathers on a bird's body. Compare: natal down and powder down.
breast
The topographical region of a bird's external anatomy between the throat and the belly.
breeding plumage
Also, nuptial plumage; summer plumage; alternate plumage. The plumage of birds during the courtship or breeding season. It results from a pre-breeding moult that many birds undergo just prior to the season. The breeding plumage is often brighter than the winter plumage, for the purposes of sexual display, but may also be cryptic, to hide incubating birds that might be vulnerable on the nest.
brood
The collective term for the offspring of birds, or the act of brooding the eggs.
brooding
See egg incubation.
broodiness
Also defined: broody. The action or behavioural tendency of a bird to sit on a clutch of eggs to incubate them, often requiring the non-expression of other behaviour including feeding and drinking. The adjective "broody" is defined as "[b]eing in a state of readiness to brood eggs that is characterised by cessation of laying and by marked changes in behaviour and physiology". Example usage: "a broody hen".
brood patch
A bare patch of skin that most female birds gain during the nesting season for thermoregulation purposes, by shedding feathers close to the belly, in an area that will be in contact with the eggs during incubation. The patch of bare skin is well supplied with blood vessels at the surface, facilitating heat transfer to the eggs.
brood parasite
Birds, such as the common goldeneye, indigobirds and whydahs, honeyguides, cowbirds, and cuckoos, that lay their eggs in other birds' nests, in order to have their chicks incubated through fledging by the parents of another bird, often of another species.

== C ==
calamus
Plural: calami. The basal part of the quill of pennaceous feathers, which embeds at its proximal tip in the skin of a bird. The calamus is hollow and has pith formed from the dry remains of the feather pulp. The calamus stretches between two openings—at its base is the inferior umbilicus and at its distal end is the superior umbilicus; the rachis of the stem, hosting the vanes, continues above it. Calamus derives from the Latin for 'reed' or 'arrow'.
call
Specific types: alarm; contact; duet; antiphonal duetting; food begging; flight; mobbing. A type of bird vocalisation tending to serve such functions as giving alarm or keeping members of a flock in contact—as opposed to a bird's song, which is longer, more complex and is usually associated with courtship and mating. Individual birds may be sensitive enough to identify each other through their calls. Many birds that nest in colonies can locate their chicks using their calls. Alarm calls are used to sound alarm to other individuals. Food-begging calls are made by baby birds to beg for food, such as the "wah" of infant blue jays. Mobbing calls signal other individuals in mobbing species while harassing a predator. They differ from alarm calls, which alert other species members to allow escape from predators. As an example, the great tit, a European songbird, uses such a signal to call on nearby birds to harass a perched bird of prey, such as an owl. This call occurs in the 4.5kHz range, and carries over long distances. However, when such prey species are in flight, they employ an alarm signal in the 7–8 kHz range. This call is less effective at traveling great distances, but is much more difficult for both owls and hawks to hear (and detect the direction from which the call came). Contact calls are used by birds for the purpose of letting others of their species know their location. Relatedly, flight calls are vocalisations made by birds while flying, which often serve to keep flocks together. These calls are also used for when birds want to alert others that they are taking flight. Many birds engage in duet calls—a call made by two birds at or nearly at the same time. In some cases, the duets are so perfectly timed as to appear almost as one call. This kind of calling is termed antiphonal duetting. Such duetting is noted in a wide range of families including quails, bushshrikes, babblers such as scimitar babblers and some owls and parrots.

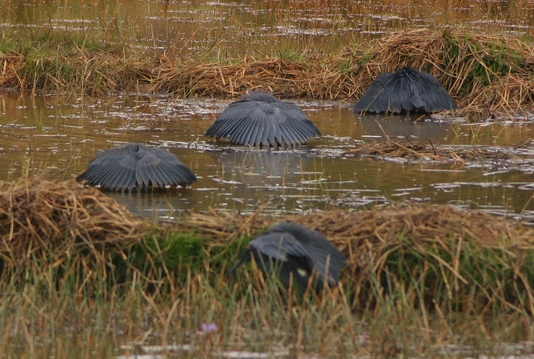
Black herons canopy feeding.

canopy feeding
Also defined: double-wing feeding. Some herons, such as the black heron, adopt an unusual position while hunting for prey. With their head held down in a hunting position, they sweep their wings forward to meet in front of their head, thereby forming an umbrella shaped canopy. To achieve full canopy closure, the primaries and secondaries touch the water, the nape feathers are erected and the tail is drooped. The bird may take several strides in this position. One theory about the function of this behaviour is that it reduces glare from the water surface, allowing the bird to more easily locate and catch prey. Alternatively, the shade provided by the canopy may attract fish making their capture easier. Some herons adopt a similar behaviour called double-wing feeding in which the wings are swept forward to create an area of shade, though a canopy is not formed.
carpal bar
A patch seen on the upperwing of some birds that usually appears as a long stripe or line. It is created by the contrast between the greater coverts and the other wing feathers.
caruncle
The collective term for the several fleshy protuberances on the heads and throats of gallinaceous birds, i.e., combs, wattles, ear lobes and nodules. They can be present on the head, neck, throat, cheeks or around the eyes of some birds. Caruncles may be featherless, or present with a small array of scattered feathers. In some species, they may form pendulous structures of erectile tissue, such as the "snood" of the domestic turkey. While caruncles are ornamental elements used by males to attract females to breed, it has been proposed that these organs are also associated with genes that encode resistance to disease, and for birds living in tropical regions, that caruncles also play a role in thermoregulation by making the blood cool faster when flowing through them.

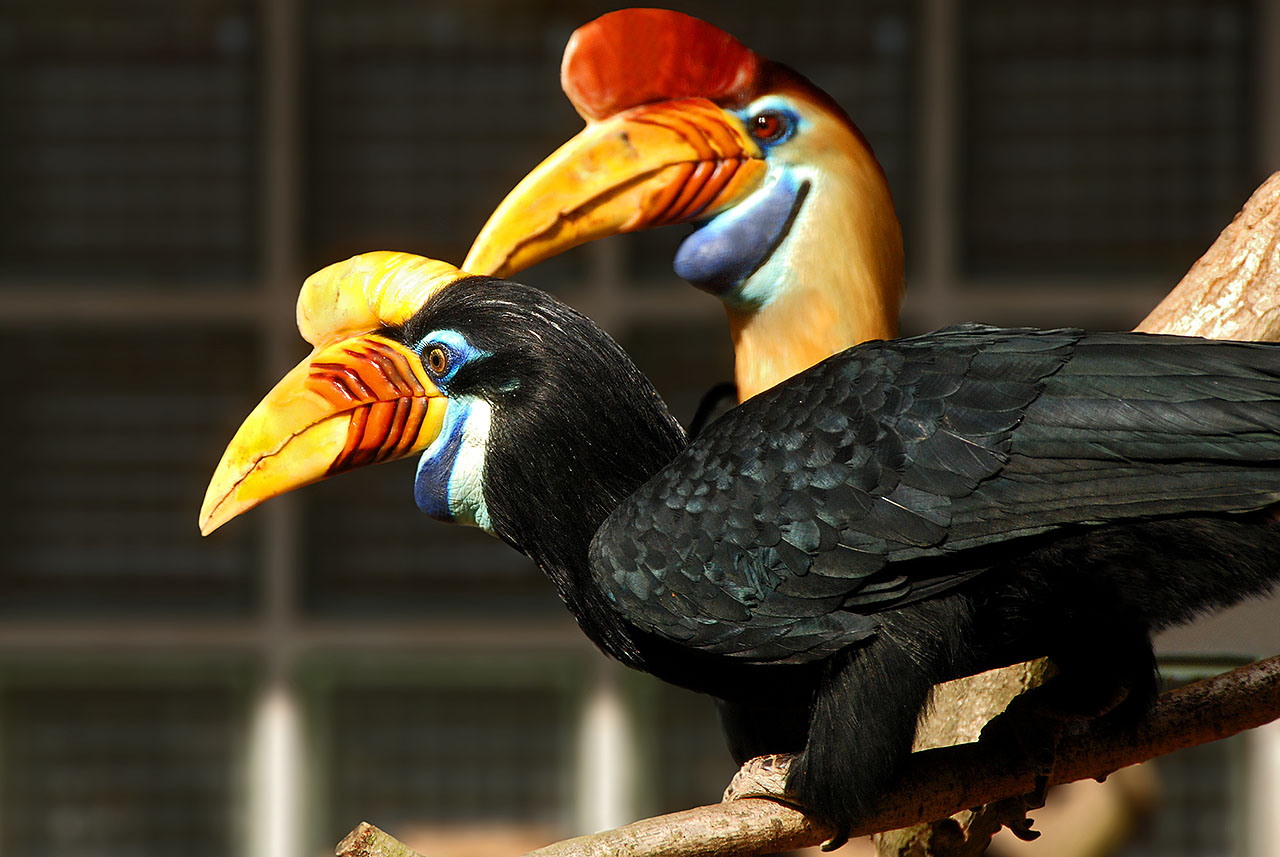
A pair of knobbed hornbills with prominent casques on display

casque
A horny ridge found on the upper mandible of a bird's bill, especially used in relation to hornbills and cassowaries, though other birds may have casques such as common moorhens, tufted puffins and (male) friarbirds. The ridge line on the upper maxilla may extend to a prominent crest on the front of the face and on the head, such as in the "flamboyant" crest of the rhinoceros hornbill. Some hornbill casques contain a hollow space that may act as a resonance chamber, amplifying calls. Similar function has been proposed for cassowary casques, as well as for protection of the head while dense vegetation is traversed, as a sexual ornament and for use as a "shovel" for digging food. Compare: frontal shield.
cere
From the Latin cera meaning 'wax', a waxy structure which covers the base of the bills of some bird species from a handful of families—including raptors, owls, skuas, parrots, turkeys and curassows. The cere structure typically contains the nares, except in owls, where the nares are distal to the cere. Although it is sometimes feathered in parrots, the cere is typically bare and often brightly coloured. In raptors, the cere is a sexual signal which indicates the "quality" of a bird; the orangeness of a Montague's harrier's cere, for example, correlates to its body mass and physical condition. The colour or appearance of the cere can be used to distinguish between males and females in some species. For example, the male great curassow has a yellow cere, which the female (and young males) lack, and the male budgerigar's cere is blue, while the female's is pinkish or brown.
cheek
Also, malar / malar region. The area of the sides of a bird's head, behind and below the eyes.
chin
A small feathered area located just below the base of the bill's lower mandible.
cloaca
A multi-purpose opening terminating at the vent at the posterior of a bird: birds expel waste from it; most birds mate by joining cloaca (a "cloacal kiss"); and females lay eggs from it. Birds do not have a urinary bladder or external urethral opening and (with exception of the ostrich) uric acid is excreted from the cloaca, along with faeces, as a semisolid waste. Additionally, in those few bird species in which males possess a penis (Palaeognathae [with the exception of the kiwis], the Anseriformes [with the exception of screamers] and in rudimentary forms in Galliformes) it is hidden within the proctodeum compartment within the cloaca, just inside the vent.
cloacal kiss
Most male birds lack a phallus and instead have erectile genital papilla at the terminus of their vas deferens. When male and female birds of such species copulate, they each evert and then press together, or "kiss" their respective proctodeum (the lip of the cloaca). Upon the clocal kiss, the male's sperm spurts into the female's urodoeum (a compartment inside the cloaca), which then make their way into the oviduct.
clutch
All of the eggs produced by birds often at a single time in a nest. Clutch size differs greatly between species, sometimes even within the same genus. It may also differ intraspecies due to many factors including habitat, health, nutrition, predation pressures and time of year. Average clutch size ranges from one (as in northern gannet) to about 17 (as in grey partridge).
colony
Also defined: seabird colony; breeding colony; communal roost; heronries; rookery. A large congregation of individuals of one or more species of bird that nest or roost in proximity at a particular location. Many kinds of birds are known to congregate in groups of varying size; a congregation of nesting birds is called a breeding colony. A group of birds congregating for rest is called a communal roost. Approximately 13% of all bird species nest colonially. Nesting colonies are very common among seabirds on cliffs and islands. Nearly 95% of seabirds are colonial, leading to the usage, seabird colony, sometimes called a rookery. Many species of terns nest in colonies on the ground. Herons, egrets, storks and other large waterfowl also nest communally in what are called heronries. Colony nesting may be an evolutionary response to a shortage of safe nesting sites and abundance or unpredictable food sources which are far away from the nest sites.
colour morph
See morph.

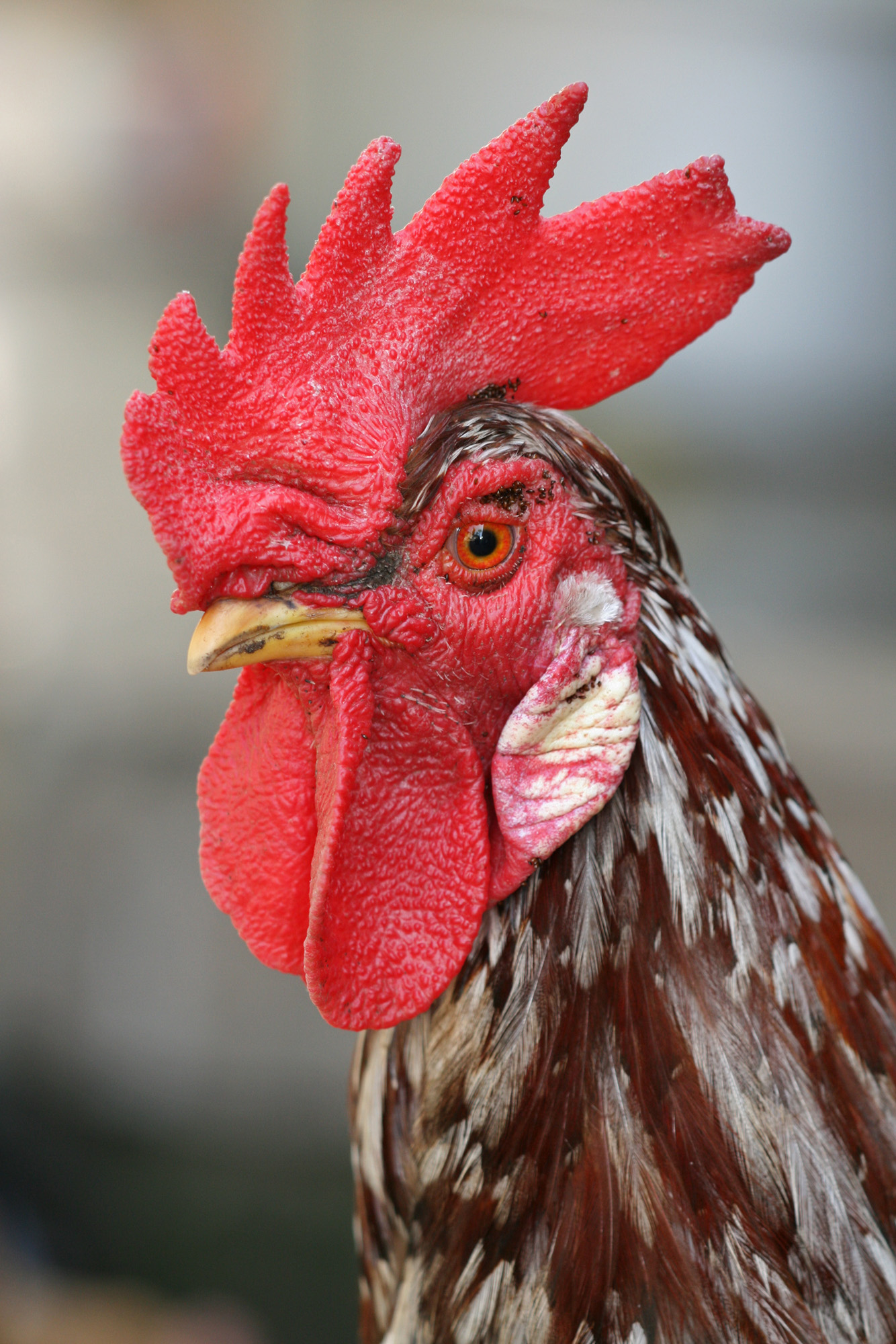
A rooster with a large red comb

comb
Also, cockscomb (coxcomb and other sp. variants). A fleshy growth or crest on the top of the head of gallinaceous birds, such as turkeys, pheasants and domestic chickens. Its alternative name, cockscomb (or coxcomb) reflects that combs are generally larger on males than on females (a male gallinaceous bird is called a cock). Comb shape varies considerably depending on the breed or species of bird. The "comb" most often refers to chickens in which the most common shape is the "single comb" of a rooster from breeds such as the leghorn. Other common comb types are the "rose comb" of, e.g., the eponymous rosecomb; the "pea comb" of, e.g., the brahma and araucana; and others.
commissure
Depending on usage, may refer to the junction of the upper and lower mandibles, or alternately, to the full-length apposition of the closed mandibles, from the corners of the mouth to the tip of the beak.
contact call
A type of call used by birds for the purpose of letting others of their species know their location.
corpuscles of Herbst
Nerve-endings similar to the Pacinian corpuscle, found in the mucous membrane of the tongue, in pits on the beak and in other parts of the bodies of birds. They differ from Pacinian corpuscles in being smaller and more elongated, in having thinner and more closely placed capsules and in that the axis-cylinder in the central clear space is encircled by a continuous row of nuclei.
coverts
Also, covert feathers; tectrices – singular: tectrix. A layer of non-flight feathers overlaying and protecting the quills of flight feathers. At least one layer of covert feathers appear both above and beneath the flight feathers of the wings as well as above and below the rectrices of the tail. These feathers may vary widely in size. For example, the upper tail tectrices of peacocks—the male peafowl—rather than its rectrices, are what constitute its elaborate and colourful "train". There are a number of types and subtypes of covert feathers—primary, secondary, greater, lesser, marginal, median, etc.—see broadly wing coverts and tail coverts.
cranial kinesis
Also defined: prokinesis, amphikinesis and distal rhynchokinesis. Movement of the upper mandible in relation to the front of the skull. There is very little of this movement in birds that feed primarily through grazing and thus do not need to open their bills very widely. This is in contrast to parrots, which use their bills to manipulate food and as a support when climbing trees. There are multiple types of cranial kinesis; prokinesis, where the bill moves only at the craniofacial hinge; amphikinesis, where the whole upper jaw is raised; and distal rhynchokinesis, where the bill flexes somewhere along the length of the bill, compared to just at the base.

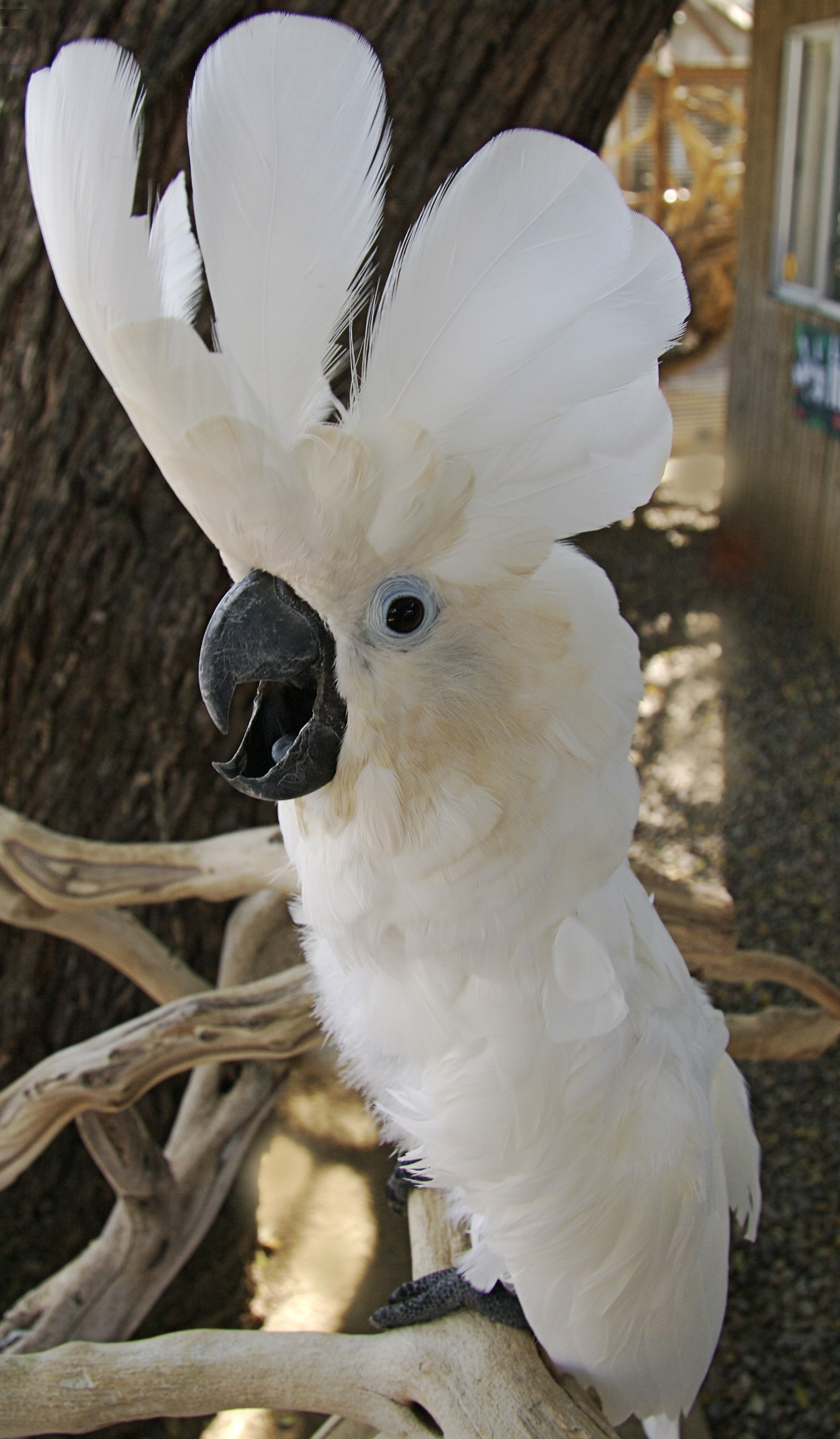
A white cockatoo, also called the umbrella cockatoo from the shape of its crest

crest feather
Collectively, the/a crest. Long crest feathers are sometimes called quill feathers. Also defined: recumbent crests and recursive crests. A type of semiplume feather with a long rachis with barbs on either side, that often presents as a prominent tuft on the crown and (or through) the neck and upper back. Birds with crests include Victoria crowned pigeons, some lapwings, macaroni penguins, waxwings and others, but the most recognisable are cockatoos and cockatiels, which can raise or lower their crests at will and use them to communicate with fellow members of their species, or as a form of defence to frighten away other species that approach too closely, making the bird appear larger when the crest is suddenly and unexpectedly raised. In some species the position of the crest is a threat signal that can be used to predict behaviour. In Steller's jays, for example, a raised crest indicates a likelihood of attack, and a lowered crest indicates a likelihood of retreat. Crests can be recumbent or recursive, depending on the species. The recumbent crest, such as in white cockatoos, has feathers that are straight and lie down essentially flat on the head until fanned out. The recursive crest, such as in sulphur-crested cockatoos and pink cockatoos, is noticeable even when its feathers are not fanned out because they curve upward at the tips even when lying flat, and when standing up, often bend slightly forward toward the front of the head. Some birds, like galahs (also known as the rose-breasted cockatoo), have modified crests that have both recumbent and recursive features.

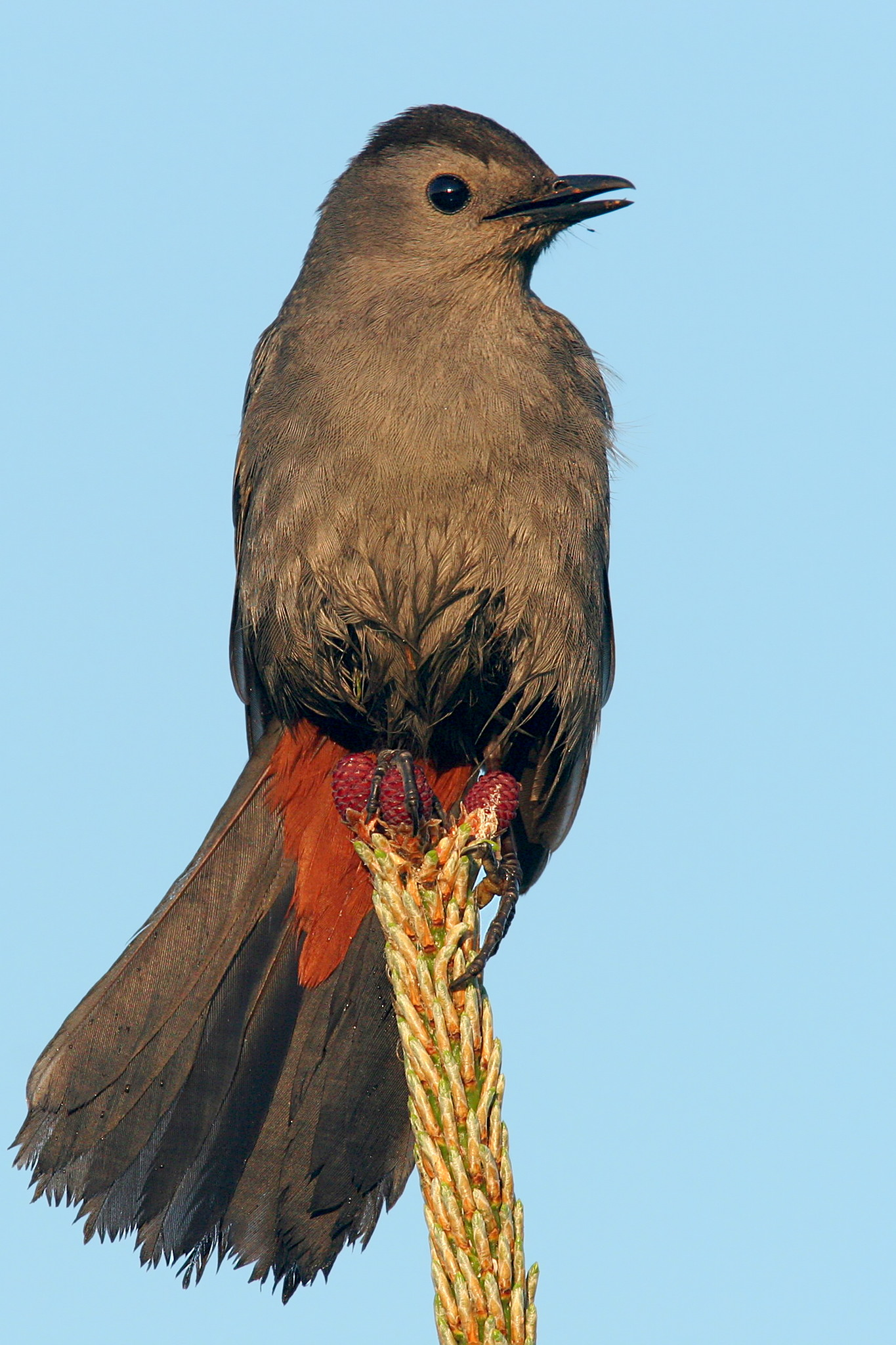
A grey catbird, with its distinctly coloured crissum on display

crissum
The feathered area between the vent and the tail. Also, the collective name for the undertail coverts. The crissal thrasher derives its name from the term, having distinctive colouring in the region, in contrast with the balance of its plumage. Other birds having distinctive crissum colour include Le Conte's thrashers and grey catbirds.
crop
An expanded, muscular pouch near the gullet or throat found in some but not all birds. It is a part of the digestive tract, essentially an enlarged part of the esophagus, used for the storage of food prior to digestion. As with most other organisms that have a crop, birds use it to temporarily store food. In adult doves and pigeons, the crop can produce crop milk to feed newly-hatched chicks.

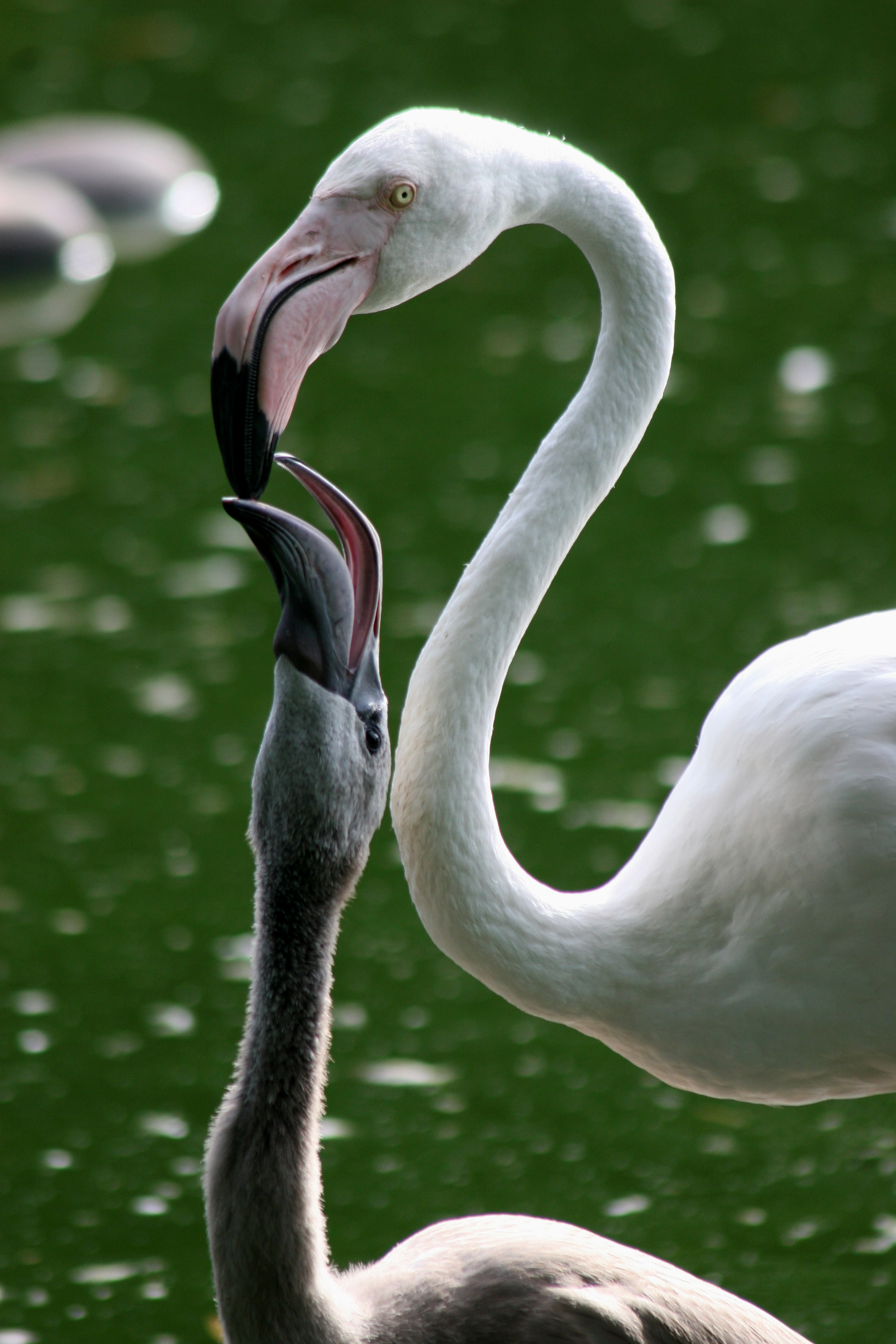
A greater flamingo chick being fed crop milk

crop milk
A secretion from the lining of the crop of parent birds that is regurgitated to young birds. It is found among all pigeons and doves where it is referred to as pigeon milk. An analogue to crop milk is also secreted from the oesophagus of flamingos and some penguins. Crop milk bears little physical resemblance to mammalian milk, the former being a semi-solid substance somewhat like pale yellow cottage cheese. It is extremely high in protein and fat, containing higher levels than cow or human milk and has been shown to also contain antioxidants and immune-enhancing factors.
crown
Also defined: occiput / hindhead. The portion of a bird's head found between the forehead—demarcated by an imaginary line drawn from the anterior corners of the eyes—and through the "remainder of the upper part of the head", to the superciliary line. The occiput or hindhead, is the posterior part of the crown.
cryptic plumage
Also defined: phaneric plumage. Plumage of a bird that is camouflaging. For example, the white winter plumage of ptarmigans is cryptic as it serves to conceal it in snowy environments. The opposite, "advertising" or "display" plumage, occasionally termed "phaneric", such as male birds in colourful nuptial plumage for sexual display, making them stand out to a high degree.
culmen
The dorsal ridge of the upper mandible. Likened by ornithologist Elliott Coues to the ridge line of a roof, it is the "highest middle lengthwise line of the bill" and runs from the point where the upper mandible emerges from the forehead's feathers to its tip. The bill's length along the culmen is one of the regular measurements made during bird ringing and is particularly useful in feeding studies. The shape or colour of the culmen can also help with the identification of birds in the field. For example, the culmen of the parrot crossbill is strongly decurved, while that of the very similar appearing red crossbill is more moderately curved.

== D ==
definitive plumage
See winter plumage.
diastataxis
The state of lacking a fifth secondary feather on each wing, which occurs in birds in more than 40 non-passerine families. In these birds, the fifth set of secondary covert feathers does not cover any remex. Loons, grebes, pelicans, hawks and eagles, cranes, sandpipers, gulls, parrots and owls are among the families missing this feather.
dietary classification terms (-vores)
Birds may be classified by terms related to the types of foods they forage for and eat. The suffix -vore is derived from the Latin vorare, meaning 'to devour'; the suffix -phage, from the same meaning in Greek, is also sometimes used. Equivalent adjectives can be formed through use of the suffixes -vorous and -phagous. For example, granivore (n.) / granivorous (adj.). Generally, classification terms are used based on predominance of food source and/or specialisation. There can be much cross-over and mixing between classifications. For example, insectivores and piscivores may at times be described more broadly as types of carnivores, and hummingbirds, though they do eat insects, are often described as nectarivores, rather than insectivores, as nectar is a specialised and predominant food foraging source for that bird family. The feeding strategies of birds is intimately tied to their physiology and evolutionary development. For example, beak shape and structure such as the makeup of the tomia, the presence (or not) of a bill tip organ and myriad other adaptations are tied to a species' feeding strategies. Feeding habits also correlate with aspects of brain development and size. For example, the spatial memory of birds that store food in various locations has been shown to be highly developed and contributes towards success at that feeding tactic.

carnivores: birds that predominantly forage for the meat of vertebrates, generally hunters as in certain birds of prey, including eagles, hawks, and owls, though piscivores, insectivores and crustacivores may be called specialised types of carnivores. Shrikes are also sometimes included, though they are more substantially insectivores with vertebrates being a small part of their total diet.
crustacivores: birds that forage for and eat crustaceans, such as the crab-plover and some rails.
detritivores: birds that forage for and eat decomposing material. It is sometimes used as a more general term than "saprovore" (defined below).
florivores: birds that forage for and eat plant flowers such as flowerpiercers; also sometimes used more generally as a synonym for herbivores.
folivores: birds that forage for and eat leaves, such as hoatzin and mousebirds.
frugivores: birds that forage for and eat fruit, such as birds-of-paradise, green pigeons, tanagers, and turacos.
granivores: (sometimes called seed-eating): birds that forage for seeds and grain, such as finches and estrildid finches.
herbivore: birds that predominantly eat plant material, and mostly do not eat meat; especially of birds that are both granivorous and frugivorous or are grass eaters, such as whistling ducks, geese, grouse, ostriches, pigeons and swans. Other terms for plant foraging specialisation may apply to herbivorous species, such as "frugivore" and "granivore".
insectivores: birds that forage for and eat insects and other arthropods, such as acrocephalid warblers, bee-eaters, cuckoos, drongos, leaf warblers, swallows, swifts and most woodpeckers.
necrophages: birds that specialise in eating dead and decaying flesh (carrion), particularly vultures and the giant petrels, and to a lesser extent ravens and other species in the family Corvidae.
nectarivores: birds that drink the nectar of flowers, such as hummingbirds, sunbirds and lorikeets.
omnivores (sometimes called general feeders): birds that forage for a variety of both plant and animal food sources, such as crows, gulls, pheasants, thrushes, quail and tinamous. More birds fall under the omnivore classification than any other; many, such as sylviid warblers, thrushes and waxwings, are largely insectivorous in spring and summer, and frugivorous in autumn and winter; while others, like the bearded reedling and buntings are primarily insectivorous in spring and summer, and granivorous in autumn and winter.
piscivores: birds that forage for and eat fish and other pond, river, and sea animals (including marine invertebrates like squid), such as albatrosses, auks, cormorants, darters, kingfishers, ospreys, mergansers, pelicans, penguins, petrels and terns.
sanguinivores: birds that forage for and drink blood, such as oxpeckers and sharp-beaked ground finches.
saprovores: sometimes used as a synonym for "necrophage" (defined above), though more usually used as a synonym of "detritivore" (defined above), for eaters of any dead matter, whether of plant or animal origin.

dimorphism
See sexual dimorphism.
diving
Also defined: surface diving; plunge diving. Some birds dive into the water for food. Two diving strategies are differentiated: surface diving birds dive from the surface of the water and swim actively underwater; and plunge diving birds dive from the air into the water. Plunge diving birds may use the momentum from the plunge to propel themselves underwater, whereas others may swim actively.

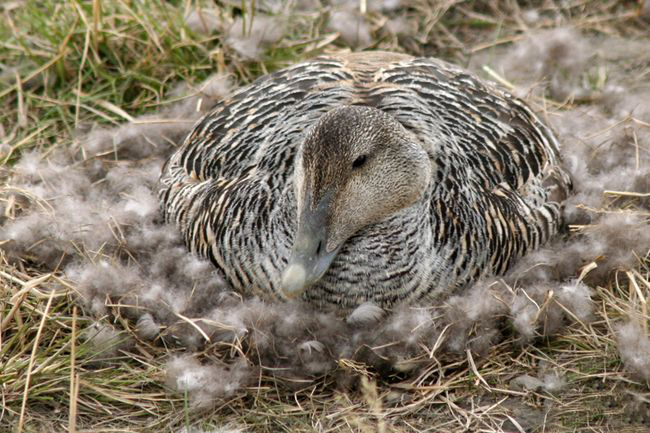
A female common eider sits on her nest, surrounded by down feathers

down
Also, down feathers or plumulaceous feathers. The down of birds—their plumulaceous feathers, as opposed to pennaceous feathers—are a layer of fine, silky feathers found under the tougher exterior feathers, that are often used by humans as a thermal insulator and padding in goods such as jackets, bedding, pillows and sleeping bags. Considered to be the "simplest" of all feather types, down feathers have a short or vestigial rachis (shaft), few barbs and barbules that lack hooks, and (unlike contour feathers) grow from both the pterylae and the apteria. Very young birds are often only clad in down. The loose structure of down feathers traps air, which helps to insulate birds against heat loss and contributes to the buoyancy of waterbirds. Species that experience annual temperature fluctuations typically have more down feathers following their autumn moult. There are three types of down: natal down, body down and powder down.
drumming
A form of non-vocal communication engaged in by members of the woodpecker family. It involves the beak striking a hard surface multiple times per second. The drumming pattern, the number of beats per roll and the gap between rolls is specific to each species. Drumming is usually associated with territorial behaviour, with male birds drumming more frequently than females. Drumming may also refer to the sounds produced by the specialised outer tail-feathers of snipe in the course of their courtship display flights.

== E ==
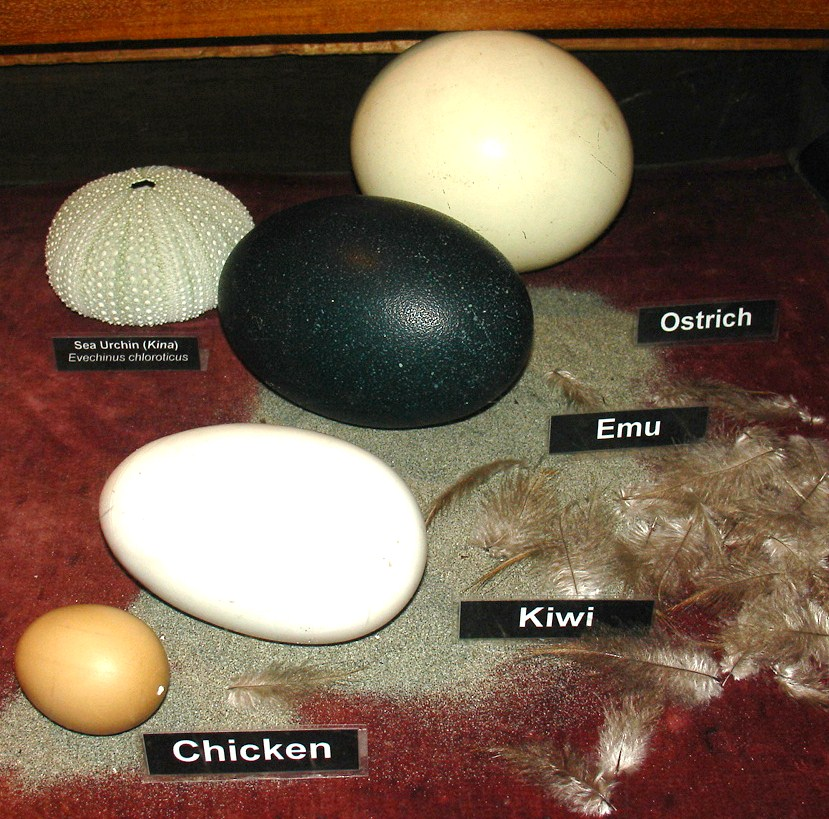
Eggs of: ostrich, emu, kiwi and chicken

ear-coverts
Small covert feathers located behind a bird's eye, in one to four rows, which cover the ear opening (bird ears have no external features) and may aid in the acuity of bird hearing.
egg
Also defined: eggshell; yolk; albumen; chalaza. The organic vessel containing the zygote, in which birds develop until hatching. Eggs are usually oval in shape, and have a base white colour from the predominant calcium carbonate makeup of the outer shell, called the eggshell, though passerine birds especially may have eggs of other colours, such as through deposition of biliverdin and its zinc chelate, which give a green or blue ground colour, and protoporphyrin which produces reds and browns. A viable bird egg (as opposed to a non-viable egg: see addled eggs) consists of a number of structures. The eggshell is 95–97% calcium carbonate crystals, at least in chickens, stabilised by a protein matrix, without which the crystalline structure would be too brittle to keep its form; the organic matrix is thought to have a role in deposition of calcium during the mineralisation process. The structure and composition of the avian eggshell serves to protect the egg against damage and microbial contamination, prevention of desiccation, regulation of gas and water exchange for the growing embryo and provides calcium for embryogenesis. Inside the eggshell are two shell membranes (inner and outer), and at the center is a yolk—a spherical structure, usually some shade of yellow, to which the fertilised gamete attaches and which the embryonic bird uses as sustenance as it grows. The yolk is suspended in the albumen (also called egg white or glair / glaire) by one or two spiral bands of tissue called the chalazae. The albumen protects the yolk and provides additional nutrition for the embryo's growth, though it is made up of approximately 90% water in most birds. Prior to fertilisation, the yolk is a single cell ovum or egg cell; one of the few single cells that can be seen by the naked eye.
egg binding
An egg that while traversing the reproductive tract during the process of being laid, becomes stuck near to the opening of the cloaca or further inside the oviduct. The condition may be caused by obesity, nutritional imbalances such as calcium deficiency, environmental stress such as temperature changes, or malformed eggs.
egg incubation
Also, brooding. The general care of unhatched eggs by parent birds (more often by females but by birds of both sexes), especially by temperature regulation through sitting on them, crouching or squatting over them, covering them with their wings, providing shade, wetting eggs and related behaviour. The target temperature of most species is 37 °C (99 °F) to 38 °C (100 °F). In monogamous species incubation duties are often shared, whereas in polygamous species one parent is wholly responsible for incubation. Warmth from parents passes to the eggs through brood patches—areas of bare skin on the abdomen or breast of the incubating birds. Incubation can be an energetically demanding process; adult albatrosses, for instance, lose as much as 83 grams (2.9 oz) of body weight per day of incubation.

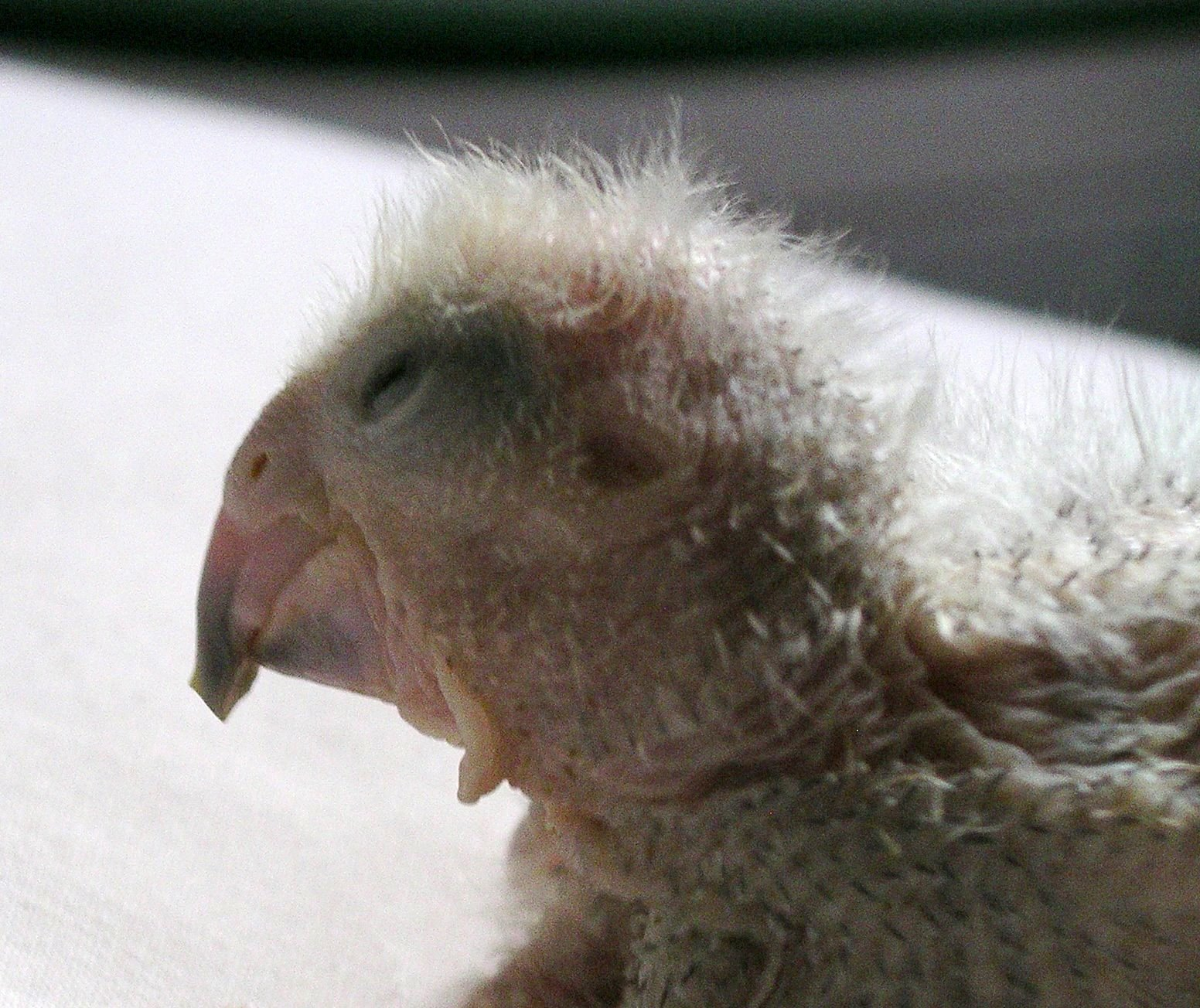
A Senegal parrot chick at about two weeks after hatching. The egg tooth is near the tip of its beak on the upper mandible.

egg tooth
A small, sharp, calcified projection on the beak that full-term chicks of most bird species have, which they use to chip their way out of their egg. This white spike is located near the tip of the upper mandible in most species (e.g., gulls); near the tip of the lower mandible instead in a minority of others, such as northern lapwings; with a few species, such as Eurasian whimbrels, black-winged stilts and semipalmated sandpipers, having one on each mandible. Despite its name, the projection is not an actual tooth (as the similarly-named projections of some reptiles are); instead, it is part of the integumentary system, as are claws and scales. The hatching chick first uses its egg tooth to break the membrane around an air chamber at the wide end of the egg. Then it pecks at the eggshell while turning slowly within the egg, eventually (over a period of hours or days) creating a series of small circular fractures in the shell. Once it has breached the egg's surface, the chick continues to chip at it until it has made a large hole. The weakened egg eventually shatters under the pressure of the bird's movements. The egg tooth is so critical to a successful escape from the egg that chicks of most species will perish unhatched if they fail to develop one.
emargination
A pronounced narrowing at some variable distance along the feather edges at the outermost primaries of large soaring birds, particularly raptors. Whether these narrowings are called notches or emarginations depends on the degree of their slope. An emargination is a gradual change, and can be found on either side of the feather. A notch is an abrupt change, and is only found on the wider trailing edge of the remige. The presence of notches and emarginations creates gaps at the wingtip; air is forced through these gaps, increasing the generation of lift.
eye-ring
Also defined: orbital ring. A visible ring of feathers around a bird's eye; the eye-ring is often paler than the surrounding feathers. By contrast, an orbital ring is bare skin ringing the eye. In some species, such as little ringed plover, the orbital ring may be quite conspicuous.
eyestripe
Also, eye line / eyeline. A visible stripe on the feathers of a bird's head, often darker than the surrounding feathers, running through the eye region. Compare supercilium.
Eye features
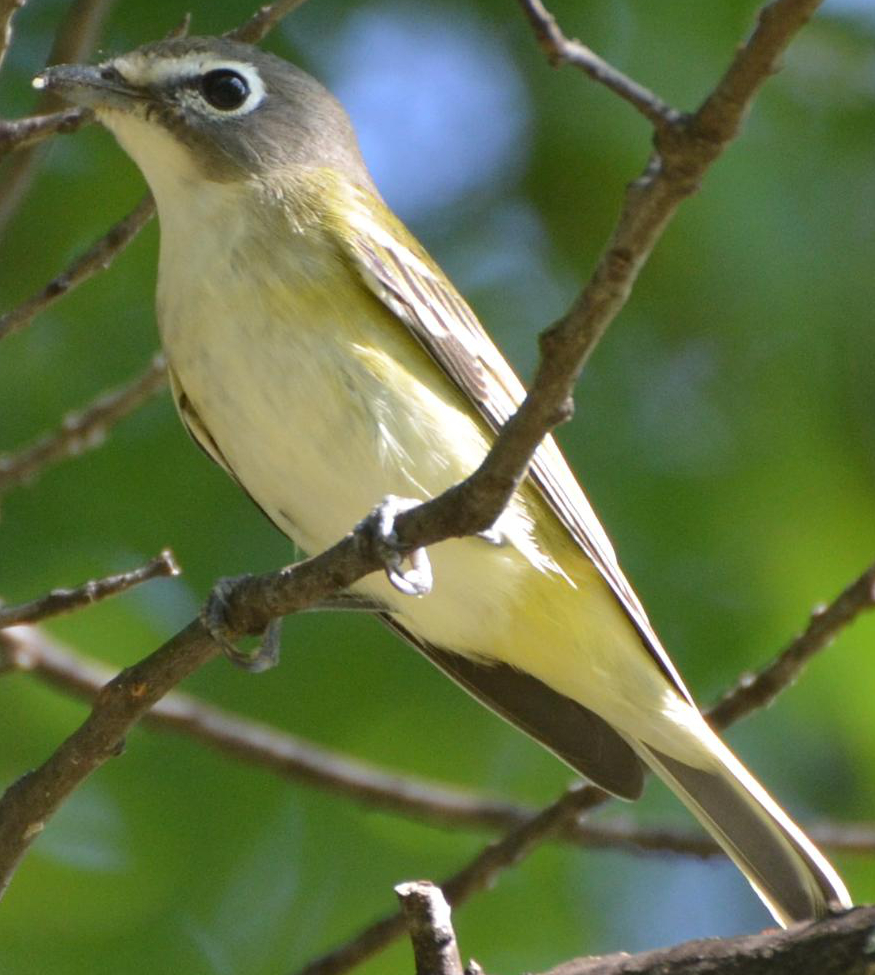
Blue-headed vireo, with a conspicuous eye-ring

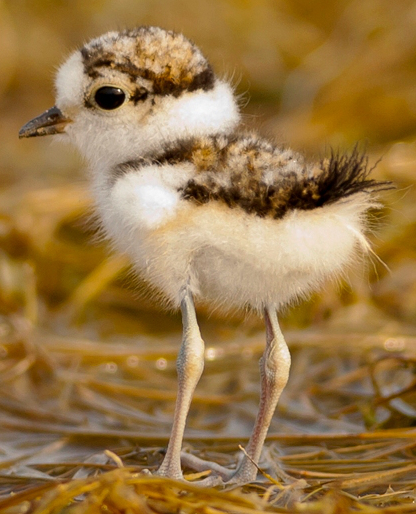
Little ringed plover chick, with a conspicuous orbital ring

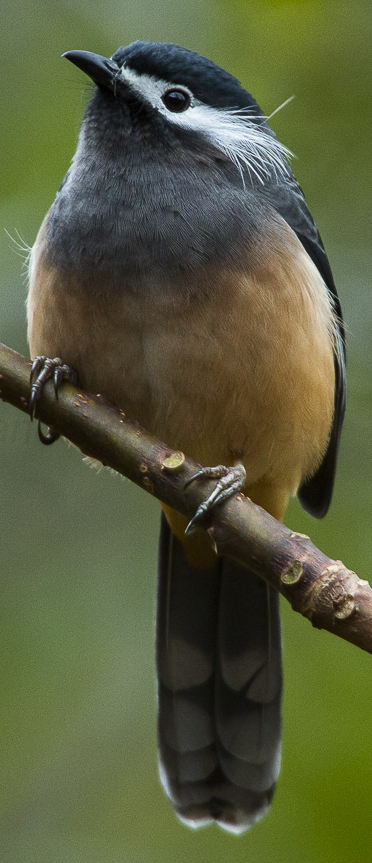
White-eared sibia, with a conspicuous eyestripe

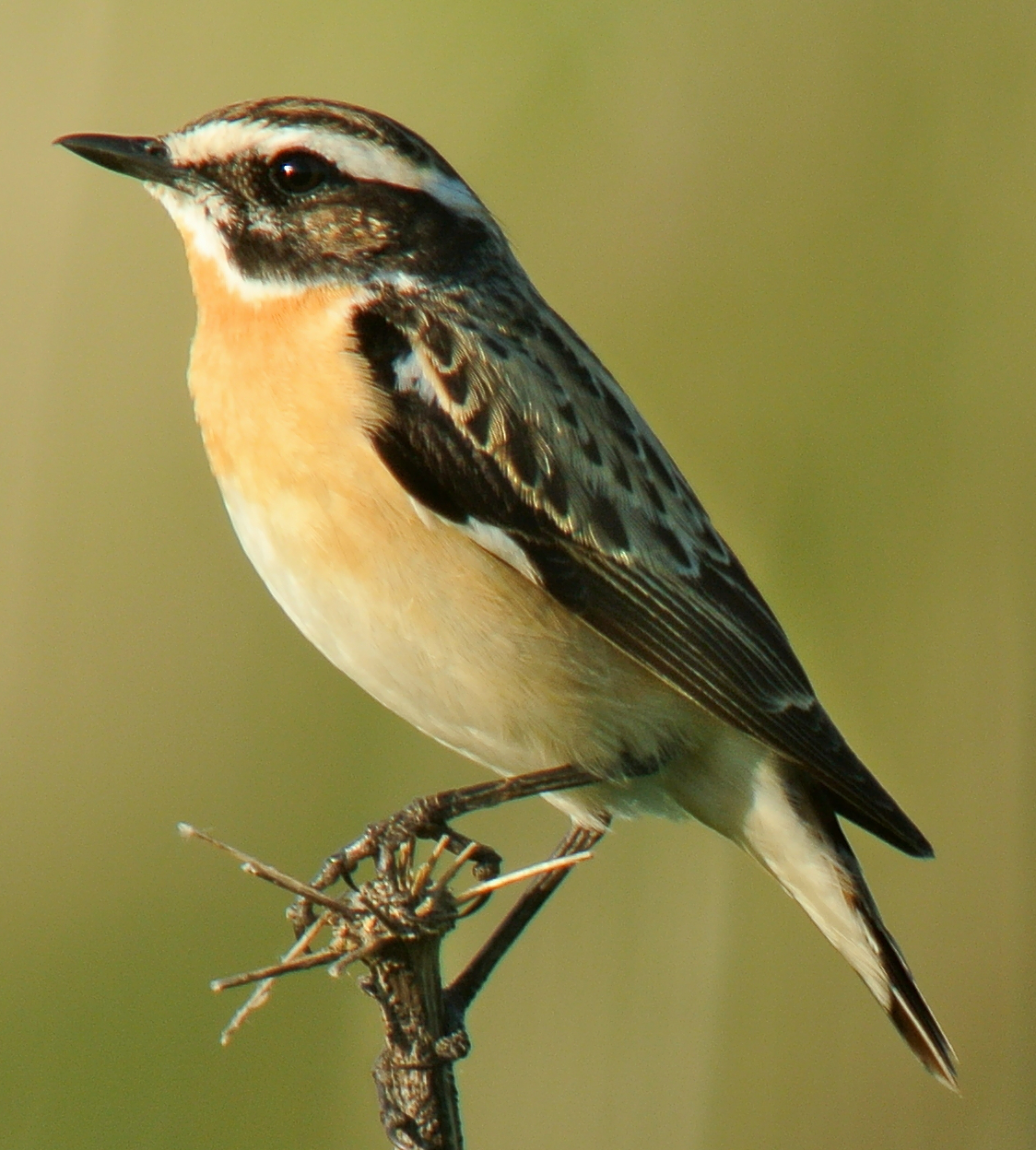
Whinchat, with a conspicuous supercilium (eyebrow)

== F ==
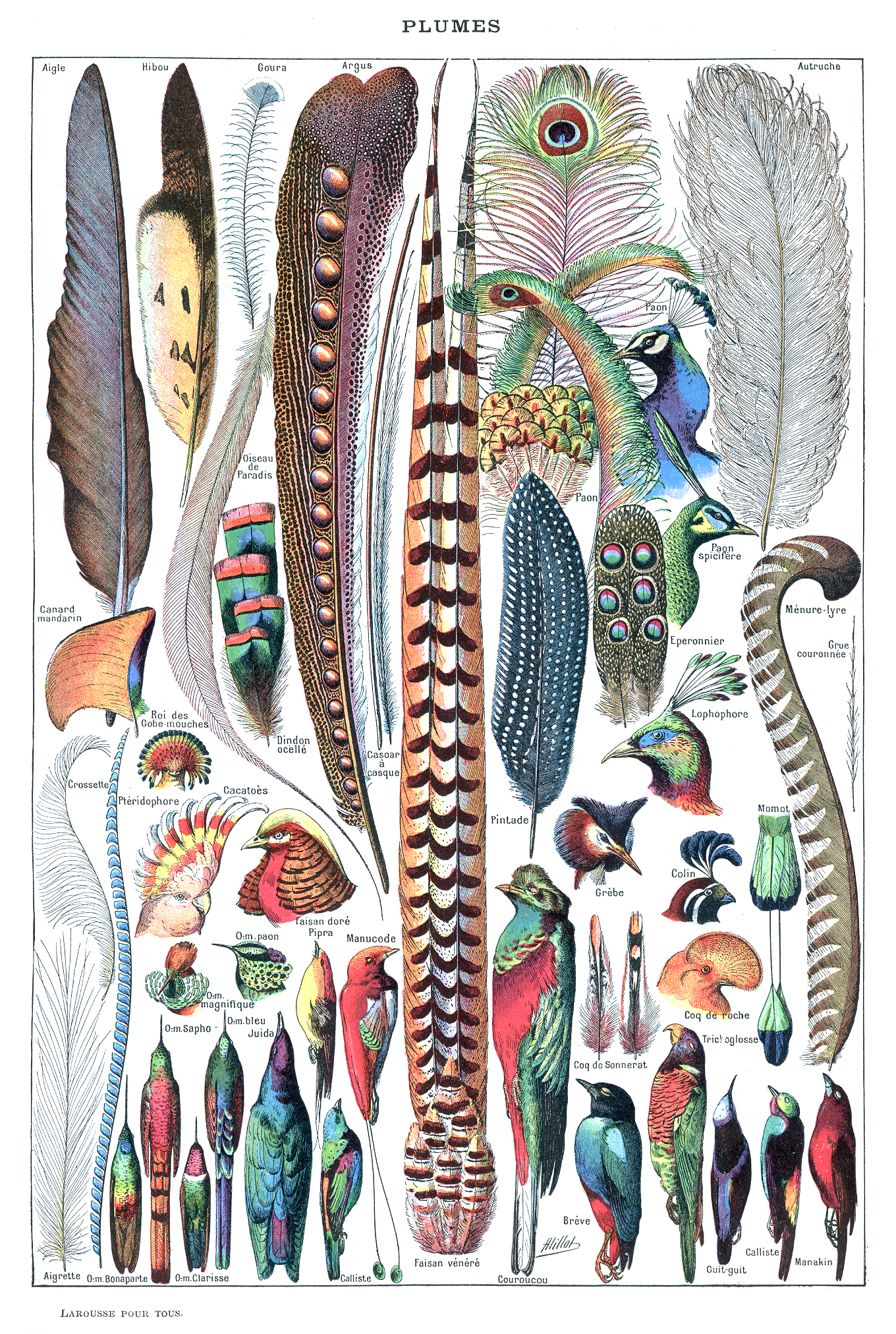
Feather variations

feather
Epidermal growths that form the distinctive outer covering, or plumage, on birds. They are considered the most complex integumentary structures found in vertebrates, and, indeed, a premier example of a complex evolutionary novelty. Feathers are among the characteristics that distinguish the extant birds from other living groups. Although feathers cover most parts of the body of birds, they arise only from certain well-defined tracts on the skin. They aid in flight, thermal insulation and waterproofing, with their colouration helping in communication and protection. Although there are many subdivisions of feathers, at the broadest levels, feathers are either classified as i) vaned feathers, which cover the exterior of the body and include pennaceous feathers, or ii) down feathers, which grow underneath the vaned feathers. A third rarer type of feather, the filoplume, is hairlike and (if present in a bird; they are entirely absent in ratites) grows alongside the contour feathers. A typical vaned feather features a main shaft called the quill with an upper section called the rachis. Fused to the rachis are a series of branches, or barbs; the barbs in turn have barbules branching off them, and they in turn branch yet again with a series of growths called barbicels, some of which have minute hooks called hooklets for cross-attachment. Down feathers are fluffy because they lack barbicels, so the barbules float free of each other, allowing the down to trap air and provide excellent thermal insulation. At the base of the feather, the rachis expands to form the hollow tubular calamus which inserts into a follicle in the skin. The basal part of the calamus is without vanes. This part is embedded within the skin follicle and has an opening at the base (proximal umbilicus) and a small opening on the side (distal umbilicus).
feather pecking
A behavioural problem in which one bird repeatedly pecks at the feathers of another, that occurs most frequently amongst domestic hens reared for egg production, although it is seen in other poultry such as pheasants, turkeys, ducks and sometimes in farmed ostriches. Two levels of severity are recognised: "gentle" and "severe".

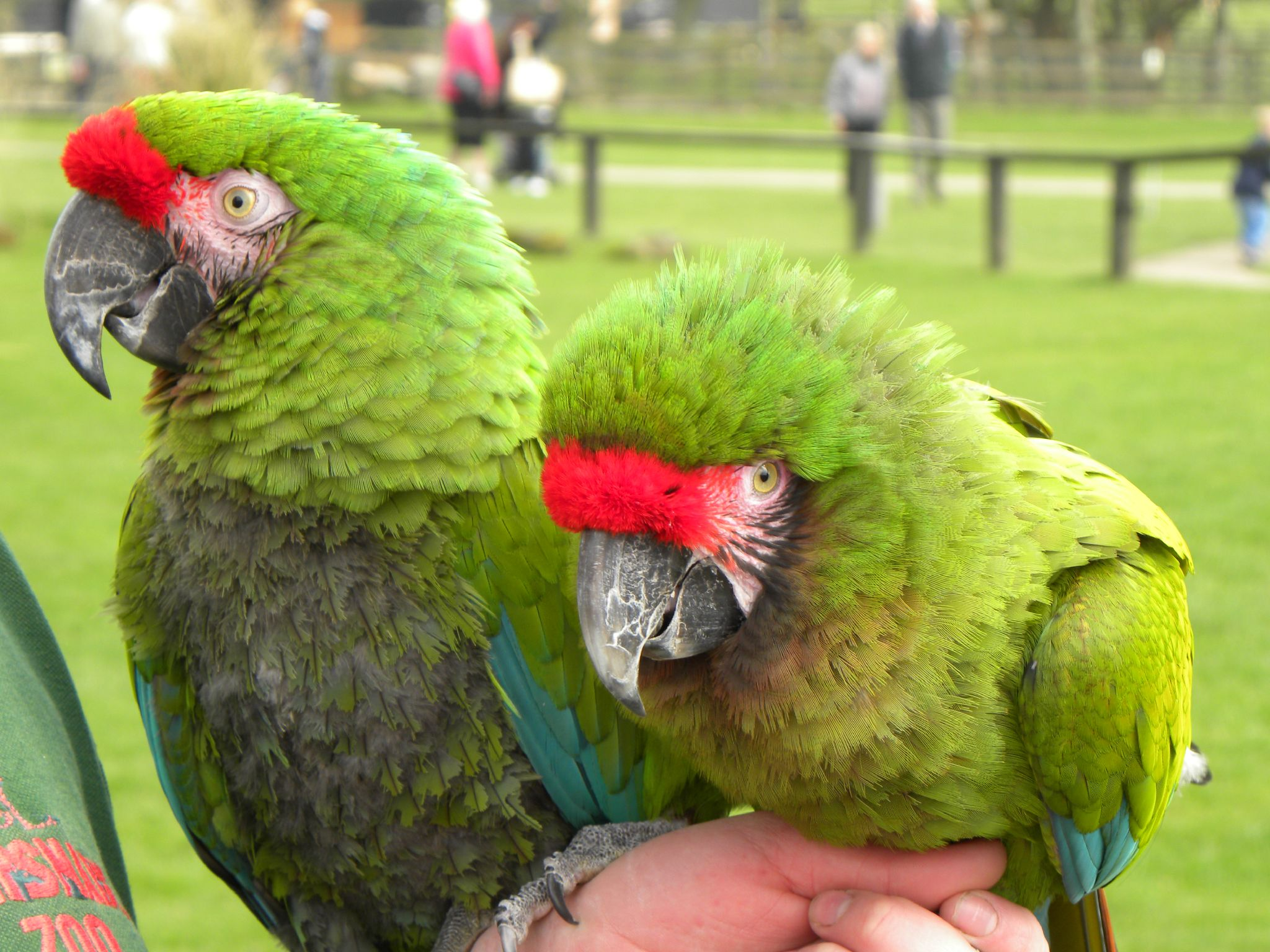
The military macaw on the left is displaying signs of feather-plucking.

feather-plucking
Also feather-picking, feather damaging behaviour or pterotillomania. A maladaptive, behavioural disorder commonly seen in captive birds which chew, bite or pluck their own feathers with their beak, resulting in damage to the feathers and occasionally the skin. It is especially common among Psittaciformes, with an estimated 10% of captive parrots exhibiting the disorder. The chief areas of the body that are pecked or plucked are the more accessible regions such as the neck, chest, flank, inner thigh and ventral wing area. Contour and down feathers are generally identified as the main targets, although in some cases, tail and flight feathers are affected. Although feather-plucking shares characteristics with feather pecking, commonly seen in commercial poultry, the behaviour is currently considered to be distinct, as in the latter, the birds peck at and pull out the feathers of other individuals.
feather tract
See: pterylae.
faecal sac
Also, fecal sac. A mucous membrane, generally white or clear with a dark end, that surrounds the faeces of some species of nestling birds, and allows parent birds to more easily remove faecal material from the nest. The nestling usually produces a faecal sac within seconds of being fed; if not, a waiting adult may prod around the youngster's cloaca to stimulate excretion. Young birds of some species adopt specific postures or engage in specific behaviour to signal that they are producing faecal sacs. For example, nestling curve-billed thrashers raise their posteriors in the air, while young cactus wrens shake their bodies. Other species deposit the sacs on the rim of the nest, where they are likely to be seen (and removed) by parent birds. Not all species generate faecal sacs. They are most prevalent in passerines and their near relatives, which have young that remain in the nest for longer periods.

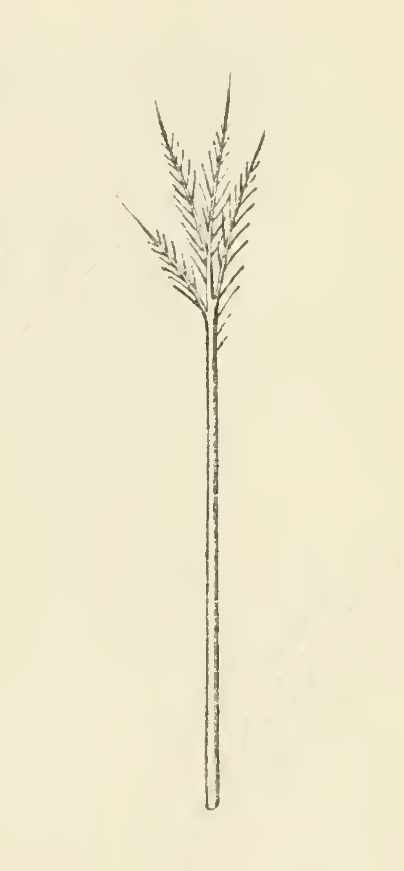
Illustration of a goose filoplume feather, from The Structure and Life of Birds (1895).

filoplume
Also, filoplume feather; hair feather, thread feather. A hairlike type of feather that, if present in a bird (they are entirely absent in ratites) grows alongside the contour feathers. The typical filoplume is silky in appearance, lacks pith and a superior umbilicous opening, has a very slender, straight shaft lacking differentiation into calamus and rachis, and is naked or has only a few barbs (that lack cross-attachment) at the distal end. They are closely associated with contour feathers and often entirely hidden by them, with one or two filoplumes attached and sprouting from near the same point of the skin as each contour feather, at least on a bird's head, neck and trunk. Filoplume feathers host a cluster of sensory corpuscles at their base, that serve to detect air currents that affect contour and flight feathers. Filoplumes are one of the three major classes of feathers, the others being pennaceous and plumulaceous feathers.
flange
Also, recurved margin. "The thickened dorsal edge of the bases of pennaceous barbules, generally recurved in proximal barbules, and frequently so in distal barbules also" which anchor the hooklets. (See diagram; refer to figures 3 [in which the flange is referred to as the "folded edge"] and 6 [in which the mechanism of interlocking between a flange and hooklet is shown].)
flanks
The topographical region of the underparts (Note: In relation to flanks being defined as under parts, in the treatise Ornithology in Laboratory and Field, the author states: "[a]lthough technically the sides of the body belong to both the upper parts and the lower parts, the imaginary line separating the two surfaces is so high on the trunk that the sides of the body are generally considered under parts only".) sketched "between the posterior half of the abdomen and the rump".
fledge
Also, fledging. The stage in a young bird's life when the feathers and wing muscles are sufficiently developed for flight, or describing the act of a chick's parents in raising it to that time threshold.
fledgling
A juvenile bird during the period it is venturing from or has left the nest and is learning to run and fly; a young bird during the period immediately after fledging, when it is still dependent upon parental care and feeding.
flight
Most birds can fly, which distinguishes them from almost all other vertebrate classes (cf. bats and pterosaurs). Flight is the primary means of locomotion for most bird species and is used for breeding, feeding and predator avoidance and escape. Birds have various adaptations for flight, including a lightweight skeleton, two large flight muscles, the pectoralis (which accounts for 15% of the total mass of the bird) and the supracoracoideus, as well as modified forelimbs (wings) that serve as aerofoils. Wing shape and size generally determine a bird species' type of flight; many birds combine powered, flapping flight with less energy-intensive soaring flight. About 60 extant bird species are flightless, as were many extinct birds. Flightlessness often arises in birds on isolated islands, probably due to limited resources and the absence of land predators. Though flightless, penguins use similar musculature and movements to "fly" through the water, as do auks, shearwaters and dippers.

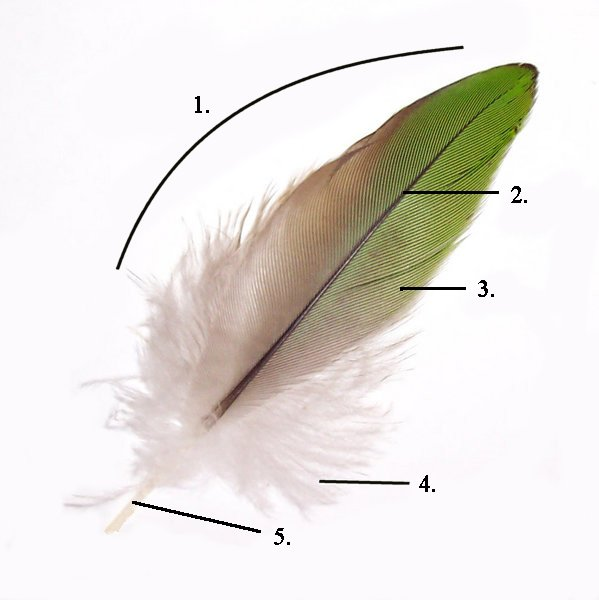
Parts of a feather: 1. vane; 2. rachis; 3. barb; 4. afterfeather; 5. calamus

flight feather
Also, Pennae volatus. The long, stiff, asymmetrically shaped, but symmetrically paired pennaceous feathers on the tail or wings of a bird; those on the tail are called rectrices (singular: rectrix), while those on the wings are called remiges (singular: remex). Based on their location, remiges are subdivided into primaries, secondaries and tertiaries.
foot paddling
A foraging behaviour of gulls in which individuals stand at a location, often in shallow water, and perform rapid stepping actions that are thought to make subterranean worms or other food rise to the surface.
forehead
The portion of a bird's head extending "up and back from the bill to an imaginary line joining the anterior corners of the eyes".
fovea
Plural: foveas or foveae. A small cavity in the retina of the eye that hosts a large number of light receptors; more than anywhere else on the retina. About one half of bird species with fovea have a single one, but uniquely in birds, some, such as terns, kingfishers and hummingbirds, have a second fovea, called the temporal fovea, that assists in judging speed and distance and increases visual acuity. Birds that do not have a second fovea will sometimes bob their head to improve their visual field.
friction barbules
A specialised type of barbule located on the distal part of the inner vane of primary feathers on the wings of most flighted birds. Friction barbules support lobe-shaped ("lobular") barbicels that are broader than the typical barbicel hosted by other vaned feathers, and which in turn support more hooklets. The theory is that the augmented surface area and other adaptations significantly increases grip through friction when the outer web of barbs of one primary feather come into contact and rub against the inner web of barbs of another primary feather it overlays, thereby preventing slippage during the rigors of flight. Friction barbules are found only on those parts of primary feathers that are in "zones of overlap" with neighboring primaries. The theory (and the use of "friction" in the title of the defined phrase) has been criticised. In Avian Flight (2005), the author notes that "most birds open and close their wings during every wing beat cycle", and proposes that the energetic cost to overcome friction during the "wing extension and flexion" of each beat cycle would be prohibitive. Offered instead is the theory that the function of these specialised barbules is to lock the primary feathers together on the wings' downstroke, during which high pressure from below the wings' surface would otherwise tend to cause the feathers to spread.
frontal shield
Also facial shield; face shield; frontal plate. A hard or fleshy plate extending from the base of the upper mandible over the forehead of several bird species including some water birds in the rail family, especially the gallinules and moorhens, swamphens and coots, as well as in jacana. While most face shields are made up of fatty tissues, some birds, such as certain turacos, e.g., the red-crested turaco, have face shields that are hard extensions of the mandible. The size, shape and colour may exhibit testosterone-dependent variation in either sex during the year. Functionality appears to relate to protection of the face while feeding in or moving through dense vegetation, as well as to courtship display and territorial defence. Compare: casque.
furcula
Also, wishbone; merry-thought. From the Latin for "little fork", the furcula is a forked bone, also found in some dinosaurs, located below the neck and formed by the fusion of the two clavicles. Its primary function is in the strengthening of the thoracic skeleton to withstand the rigors of flight. It works as a strut between a bird's shoulders, and articulates to each of a bird's scapulae. In conjunction with the coracoid and the scapula, it forms a unique structure called the triosseal canal, which houses a strong tendon that connects the supracoracoideus muscles to the humerus. This system is responsible for lifting the wings during a recovery stroke. As the thorax is compressed by the flight muscles during a downstroke, the upper ends of the furcula spread apart, expanding by as much as 50% of its resting width, and then contract. Furcula may also aid in respiration, by helping to pump air through the air sacs.

== G ==
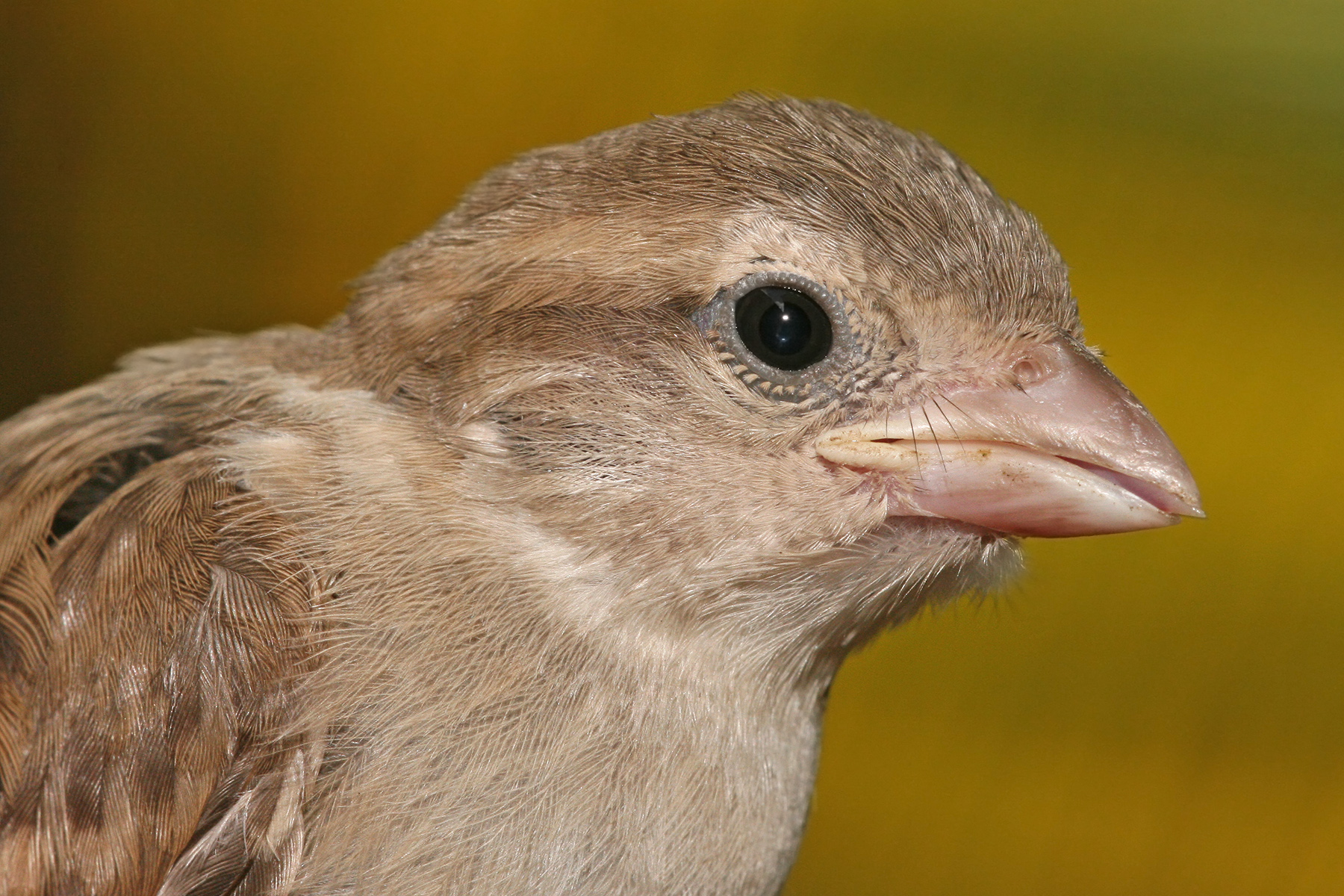
The gape flange on this juvenile house sparrow is the yellowish region at the base of the beak.

gape
The interior of the open mouth of a bird. The width of the gape can be a factor in the choice of food.
gape flange
The region where the upper and lower mandibles join together at the base of the beak. When born, the chick's gape flanges are fleshy. As it grows into a fledgling, the gape flanges remain somewhat swollen and can thus be used to recognise that a particular bird is young. Gape flanges can serve as a target for food for parents, and when touched, stimulate the nestling to open its mouth to eat.
gizzard
Also, ventriculus; gastric mill; gigerium. A specialised stomach organ found in the digestive tract of some birds constructed of thick muscular walls that is used for grinding up food, often aided by particles of stone or grit. Food, after going through the crop and proventriculus, passes into the gizzard where it can be ground with previously swallowed stones and passed back to the proventriculus, and vice versa. Bird gizzards are lined with a tough layer made of a carbohydrate-protein complex called koilin, that protects the muscles in the gizzard.
gleaning
Specialised cases: foliage gleaning; hover-gleaning; crevice-gleaning. The strategy of gleaning over surfaces by birds to catch invertebrate prey—chiefly insects and other arthropods—by plucking them from foliage or the ground, from crevices such as of rock faces and under the eaves of houses, or even, as in the case of ticks and lice, from living animals. Gleaning the leaves and branches of trees and shrubs is called "foliage gleaning", which can involve a variety of styles and maneuvers. Some birds, such as the common chiffchaff of Eurasia and the Wilson's warbler of North America, feed actively and appear energetic. Some will even hover in the air near a twig while gleaning from it; this behaviour is called "hover-gleaning". Other birds are more methodical in their approach to gleaning, even seeming lethargic as they perch upon and deliberately pick over foliage. This behaviour is characteristic of the bay-breasted warbler and many vireos. Another tactic is to hang upside-down from the tips of branches to glean the undersides of leaves. Tits such as the familiar black-capped chickadee are often observed feeding in this manner. Some birds, like the ruby-crowned kinglet, use a combination of these tactics. "Crevice-gleaning" is a niche particular to dry and rocky habitats. Gleaning birds are typically small with compact bodies and have small, sharply pointed beaks. Birds often specialise in a particular niche, such as a particular stratum of forest or type of vegetation.
gnathotheca
The rhamphotheca (thin horny sheath of keratin) covering the lower mandible.
gonys
The ventral ridge of the lower mandible, created by the junction of the bone's two rami, or lateral plates.
gonydeal angle
Also, gonydeal expansion. The proximal end of the junction created by the gonys two rami, or lateral plates—the place where the two plates separate. The size and shape of the gonydeal angle can be useful in identifying between otherwise similar species.
gonydeal spot
The spot near the gonydeal expansion, in adults of many bird species but especially in gulls, usually reddish or orangish in colour, that triggers begging behaviour. Gull chicks, for example, peck at the spot on its parent's bill, which in turn stimulates the parent to regurgitate food.

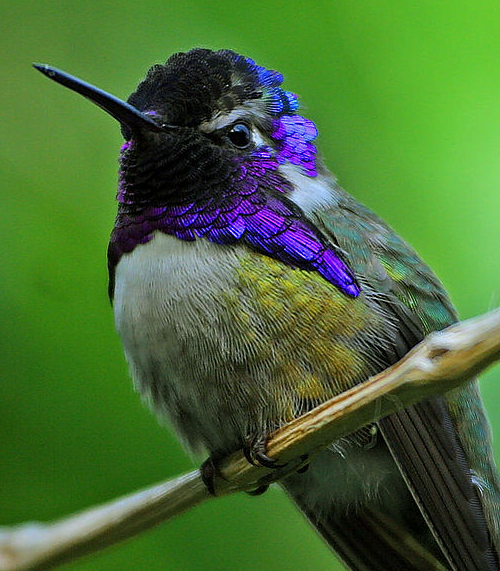
Male Costa's hummingbird (Calypte costae) with an iridescent gorget

gorget
A patch of coloured feathers found on the throat or upper breast of some species of birds. It is a feature found on many male hummingbirds, particularly those found in North America, whose gorgets are typically iridescent. Other species having gorgets include the purple-throated fruitcrow and the chukar partridge. The term is derived from the gorget used in military armor to protect the throat.
grooming
See entry for preening.
gular region
The posterior part of the underside of a bird's head, described as "a continuation of the chin to an imaginary line drawn between the angles of the jaw". See also: gular skin.
gular skin
Also defined, gular sac / throat sac; gular pouch; gular flutter. Describes the gular region when it is featherless. In many species, the gular skin forms a flap, or gular pouch, which is generally used to store fish and other prey while hunting. In many others, such as frigatebirds, the gular skin may overlie a sac—the gular sac or throat sac—that may be dramatically inflated by males during courtship display. In some species the gular region is used for thermoregulation, by the fluttering of the hyoid bone and surrounding muscles, vibrating as many as 735 times per minute, which causes an increase in heat dissipation from the gular skin.

== H ==
hallux
Also, hind toe; first digit. Specialised types: incumbent and elevated. A bird's usually rear-facing toe; its hind toe. When it is attached near the base of the metatarsus it is termed incumbent, and when projecting from a higher portion of the metatarsus (as in rails), it is termed elevated. The hallux is a bird's first digit, in many birds being the sole rear-facing toe (including in most passerine species that have anisodactylous feet) and is homologous to the human big toe.
home range
Also defined: territory. The area of land in which a bird performs most of its activities. When the area is guarded (in whole or in part) from individuals of the same species it is called a territory. These territories may be temporary or permanent, breeding or non-breeding. Breeding territories may be of four types: i) an all-purpose territory where all activities are conducted; ii) a separate breeding and feeding territory (or just a breeding territory, with foraging conducted outside of it); iii) a territory surrounding the nest and a very small area outside of it; iv) a small territory used solely for display within a lek. The size of the home range can be affected by what food a bird eats and how much the bird weighs. Birds that weigh more usually have larger ranges, and carnivores on average have larger ranges than non-carnivores.
Humphrey–Parkes terminology
A system of nomenclature for the plumage of birds proposed in 1959 by Philip S. Humphrey and Kenneth C. Parkes to make the terminology for describing bird plumages more uniform, but using counterintuitive terminology and little used outside of a small circle in the United States. Examples of Humphrey–Parkes terminology versus standard terminology may be seen in the entries for prealternate moult and prebasic moult.
hyoid apparatus
The system of bones to which the tongue is attached. It usually includes the tongue bone, to which the tongue is actually attached, the basihyal, behind the tongue bone, the urohyal, itself behind the basihyal, a pair of ceratobranchial bones, and a pair of epibranchial. The latter two bones form the hyoid horns, which are contained in a pair of fascia vaginalis. This allows the tongue to slide out smoothly. The hyoid apparatus is attached to the larynx.

== I ==
in pin
See #pin feather
inferior umbilicus
Also, proximal umbilicus. A small opening located at the bottom tip of a feather's shaft, i.e., at the base of the calamus, that is embedded within the skin of a bird. The growth of the feather is fed by the flow through the inferior umbilicus of a nutrient (or nutritive) pulp of highly vascular dermal cells (sometimes called the nutritive dermis; a part of what is termed the Malpighian layer), that in turn produce a nourishing plasma. In mature feathers the opening is sometimes sealed over by a keratinous plate. Compare: superior umbilicus.
inner wing
Also defined: outer wing. The inner wing of a bird is that portion of the wing stretching from its connection to the body and through the "wrist" joint. The outer wing stretches from the wrist to the wingtip.
iris
The coloured outer ring that surrounds a bird's pupil. Though brown predominates, the iris may be of or include a variety of colours—red, yellow, grey, blue, etc.—and the colouration may vary according to the age, sex and species.

== J ==
jizz
Also, gestalt, of which the term may be a corruption (or possibly deriving from the air force acronym GISS for "General Impression of Size and Shape (of an aircraft)", associated with World War II lingo; though this derivation may by anachronistic as jizz was first used in birdwatching as early as 1922), it describes the overall impression or appearance of a bird—"the indefinable quality of a particular species, the 'vibe' it gives off"—garnered from such features as shape, posture, flying style or other habitual movements, size and colouration combined with voice, habitat and location. Example use: "It had the jizz of a thrush, but I couldn't make out what kind"
.

== K ==
keel
Also, carina. An extension of the sternum (breastbone) which runs axially along the midline of the sternum and extends outward, perpendicular to the plane of the ribs. The keel provides an anchor to which a bird's wing muscles attach, thereby providing adequate leverage for flight. Keels do not exist on all birds; in particular, some flightless birds lack a keel structure. Historically, the presence or absence of a pronounced keel structure was used as a broad classification of birds into two orders: Carinatae (from Latin carina, 'keel'), having a pronounced keel; and ratites (from Latin ratis, 'raft'—referring to the flatness of the sternum), having a subtle keel structure or lacking one entirely. However, this classification has fallen into disuse as evolutionary studies have shown that many flightless birds have evolved from flighted birds.
kleptoparasitism
A bird's propensity to steal food from other birds, either opportunistically, or on a regular basis.

== L ==
lateral throat-stripe
A usually dark stripe of colour bordering the throat below both the moustachial stripe and the submoustachial stripe, if any.
lek
Also defined: lekking; dispersed lek. An aggregation of male birds gathered to engage in competitive displays (known as lekking) that may entice visiting females that are assessing prospective partners for copulation. These males are usually in sight of each other, but when they are only in earshot, it is called a dispersed lek or an exploded lek. Mating usually occurs on the display area.
lore
Adj. form: loreal. The topographical region of a bird's head between the eye and the beak on the sides of the head.
lower mandible
Also, mandible. The lower part of a bird's bill or beak, roughly corresponding to the lower jaw of mammals, it is supported by a bone known as the inferior maxillary bone—a compound bone composed of two distinct ossified pieces. These ossified plates (or rami), which can be U-shaped or V-shaped, join distally (the exact location of the joint depends on the species) but are separated proximally, attaching on either side of the head to the quadrate bone. The jaw muscles, which allow the bird to close its beak, attach to the proximal end of the lower mandible and to the bird's skull. The muscles that depress the lower mandible are usually weak, except in a few birds such as the starlings (and the extinct Huia), which have well-developed digastric muscles that aid in foraging by prying or gaping actions. In most birds, these muscles are relatively small as compared to the jaw muscles of similarly sized mammals. The outer surface is covered in thin horny sheath of keratin called rhamphotheca, specially called gnathotheca in the lower mandible. Compare: upper mandible.

== M ==
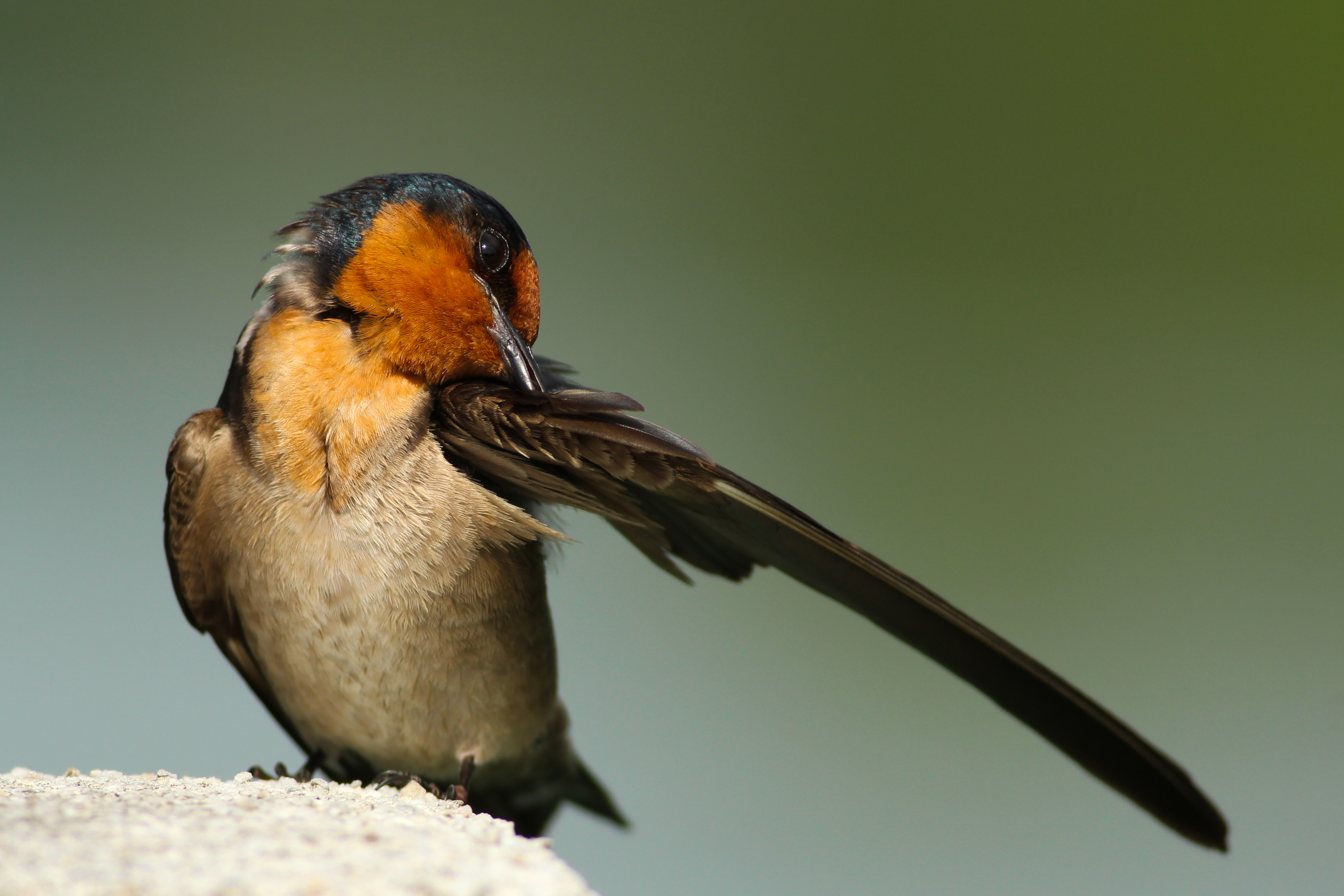
Barn Swallow preening; one of several types of maintenance behaviour

maintenance behaviour
Also, comfort behaviour. The name given to any behaviour or activity which a bird uses to maintain its plumage and soft parts: preening, bathing, anting, sunbathing, stretching, scratching, and other such activities. Roosting is also often considered to be a comfort behaviour. The phrase is sometimes used more inclusively, to describe all life-sustaining activities, such as feeding, drinking, predator avoidance, and locomotion, and even involuntary biological processes, like moulting.
mandible
In birds, the word mandible, alone, usually refers to the lower mandible.
mantle
The forward area of a bird's upper side sandwiched between the hindneck and the start of the back. However, in gulls and terns, the term is often used to refer to much of the upper surface below the hindneck.
migration
Also defined: partial migration. The regular seasonal movement, often north and south, undertaken by many species of birds. Bird movements include those made in response to changes in food availability, habitat, or weather. Sometimes journeys are not termed "true migration" because they are irregular (nomadism, invasions, irruptions) or only in one direction (dispersal, movement of young away from natal areas). Migration is marked by its annual seasonality. Non-migratory birds are said to be resident or sedentary. Approximately 1,800 of the world's bird species are long-distance migrants. Many bird populations migrate long distances along a flyway. The most common pattern involves flying north in the northern spring to breed in the temperate or Arctic summer, and returning in the autumn to wintering grounds in warmer regions to the south. In the southern hemisphere the directions are reversed, but there is less land area in the far south to support long-distance migration. Not all populations within a species may be migratory; this is known as "partial migration". Partial migration is very common in birds of the southern continents. For example, in Australia, 44% of non-passerine birds and 32% of passerine species are partially migratory. Many, if not most birds migrate in flocks. For larger birds, flying in flocks reduces the energy cost, e.g., geese in a V-formation may conserve 12–20% of the energy they would otherwise need if flying alone.
morph
Also, colour/color morph. Polymorphic variance in the colouring of the plumage between individuals of the same species, unrelated to age, sex or season. For example, the snow goose has two plumage morphs, white (snow) or grey/blue (blue), thus the common description of individuals as either "snows" or "blues". At one time this colour morph resulted in the "blue goose" being classified as a separate species.
moult
Also, molt (chiefly U.S.) and moulting / molting. The periodic replacement of feathers by shedding old feathers while producing new ones. Feathers are dead structures at maturity which are gradually abraded and need to be replaced. Adult birds moult at least once a year, although many moult twice and a few three times each year. It is generally a slow process, as birds rarely shed all their feathers at any one time; the bird must retain sufficient feathers to regulate its body temperature and repel moisture. The number and area of feathers that are shed varies. In some moulting periods, a bird may renew only the feathers on the head and body, shedding the wing and tail feathers during a later moulting period. Some species of bird become flightless during an annual "wing moult" and must seek a protected habitat with a reliable food supply during that time. Typically, a bird begins to shed some old feathers, then pin feathers grow in to replace the old feathers. As the pin feathers become full feathers, other feathers are shed. This is a cyclical process that occurs in many phases. It is usually symmetrical, with feather loss equal on each side of the body. Because feathers make up 4–12% of a bird's body weight, it takes a large amount of energy to replace them. For this reason, moults often occur immediately after the breeding season, but while food is still abundant. The plumage produced during this time is called post-breeding plumage.
moult strategy
Specialised types defined: simple basic strategy; simple alternate strategy; complex basic strategy; complex alternate strategy. The pattern of moults that occurs regularly based on the season and time. There are four main moulting strategies: i) simple basic strategy, in which there is one moult per year, every year; ii) simple alternate strategy, in which there are two moults per year, every year; iii) complex basic strategy, in which there is one moult per year, except in the first year of life, where there is an additional moult; and iv) complex alternate strategy, in which there are two moults per year, except in the first year of life, where there is an additional moult.

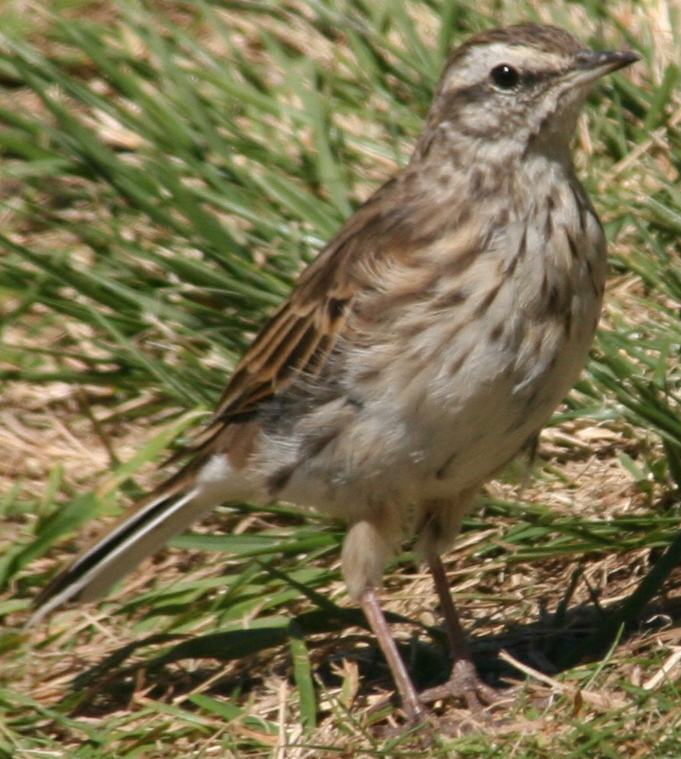
New Zealand pipit Anthus novaeseelandiae novaeseelandiae, displaying a prominent moustachial stripe

moustachial stripe
Also, mustache stripe; whisker stripe; malar stripe. A dark feather colouration line running "obliquely from the gape down and along the lower border of the ear-coverts". Compare: submoustachial stripe and lateral throat-stripe. Birds with moustachial stripes include some of the pipits as well as buntings.

== N ==
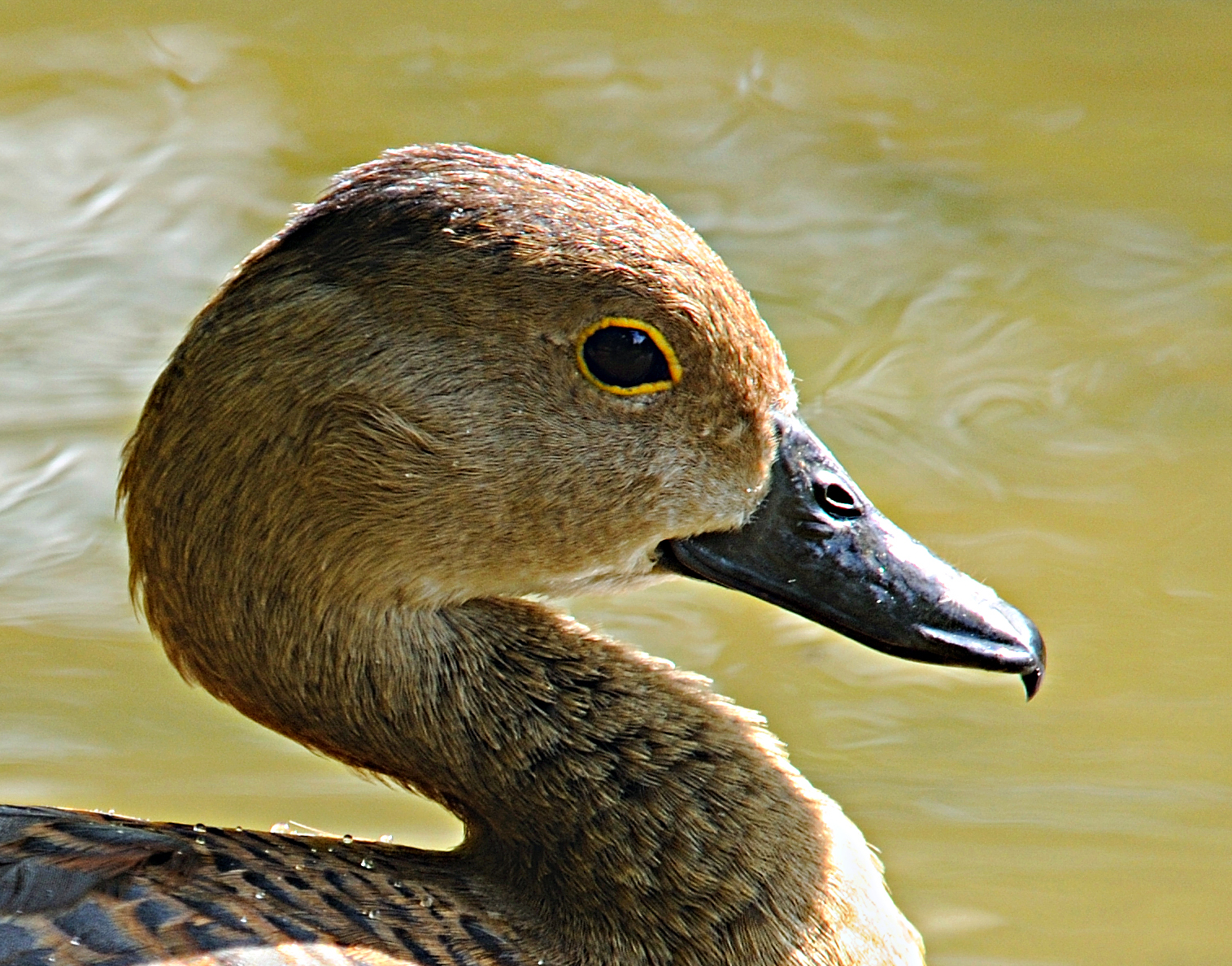
Close up of a lesser whistling duck. Note the hooked nail at the tip of the beak.

nail
A plate of hard horny tissue at the tip of the beak of all birds in the family Anatidae (ducks, geese and swans). This shield-shaped structure, which sometimes spans the entire width of the beak, is often bent at the tip to form a hook. It serves different purposes depending on the bird's primary food source. Most species use their nails to dig seeds out of mud or vegetation, while diving ducks use theirs to pry molluscs from rocks. There is evidence that the nail may help a bird to grasp things; species which use strong grasping motions to secure their food (such as when catching and holding onto a large squirming frog) have very wide nails. Certain types of mechanoreceptors, nerve cells that are sensitive to pressure, vibration or touch, are located under the nail.
nape
Also defined: hindneck. The back of the head, behind the crown. The area between the nape and the mantle is known as the hindneck.
nares
The two holes—circular, oval or slit-like in shape—which lead to the nasal cavities within the bird's skull, and thus to the rest of the respiratory system. In most bird species, the nares are located in the basal third of the upper mandible. Kiwis are a notable exception; their nares are located at the tip of their bills. A handful of species have no external nares. Cormorants and darters have primitive external nares as nestlings, but these close soon after the birds fledge; adults of these species (and gannets and boobies of all ages, which also lack external nostrils) breathe through their mouths. There is typically a septum made of bone or cartilage that separates the two nares, but in some families (including gulls, cranes and New World vultures), the septum is missing. While the nares are uncovered in most species, they are covered with feathers in a few groups of birds, including grouse and ptarmigans, crows and some woodpeckers.
nasal canthus
The area where the eyelids come together at the anterior corner of the eye, on the side of the nares, as opposed to the temporal canthus.
natal down
Also, neossoptiles. Also defined: protoptiles; mesoptiles. The layer of down feathers that cover most birds at some point in their early development. Precocial nestlings are already covered with a layer of down when they hatch, while altricial nestlings develop their down layer within days or weeks of hatching. Megapode hatchlings are the sole exception; they are already covered with contour feathers when they hatch. The natal down coat is usually lost within a week or two of hatching. There are two different kinds of natal down feathers; protoptiles and mesoptiles. The former appears first and the latter appears second. Hathchlings born naked or with a diffuse coat of scant natal down feathers are called psilopaedic, while those born covered with a dense fuzz of natal down are termed ptilopaedic. Compare: body down and powder down.

An overview of the diversity in nest placement and construction

nest
Also, bird nest. Specialised types: burrow; cavity; cup (adherent cup; statant cup); dome; dormitory; eyries (or aeries); hanging; ledge; mound; pendant; platform; roost (or winter-nest); scrape; saucer or plate; and sphere. The spot in which a bird lays and incubates its eggs and raises its young. Although the term popularly refers to a specific structure made by the bird itself—such as the grassy cup nest of the American robin or Eurasian blackbird, or the elaborately woven hanging nest of the Montezuma oropendola or the village weaver—for some species, a nest is simply a shallow depression made in sand; for others, it is the knot-hole left by a broken branch, a burrow dug into the ground, a chamber drilled into a tree, an enormous rotting pile of vegetation and earth, a shelf made of dried saliva or a mud dome with an entrance tunnel. The smallest bird nests are those of some hummingbirds, tiny cups which can be a mere 2 cm (0.79 in) across and 2–3 cm (0.79–1.18 in) high. At the other extreme, some nest mounds built by the dusky scrubfowl measure more than 11 m (36 ft) in diameter and stand nearly 5 m (16 ft) tall. Not all bird species build nests. Some species lay their eggs directly on the ground or rocky ledges, while brood parasites lay theirs in the nests of other birds, letting unwitting "foster parents" do all the work of rearing the young. Although nests are primarily used for breeding, they may also be reused in the non-breeding season for roosting and some species build special dormitory nests or roost nests (or winter-nest) that are used only for roosting. Most birds build a new nest each year, though some refurbish their old nests. The large eyries (or aeries) of some eagles are platform nests that have been used and refurbished for several years. In most species, the female does most or all of the nest construction, though the male often helps. The nest may form a part of the courtship display, such as in weaver birds.

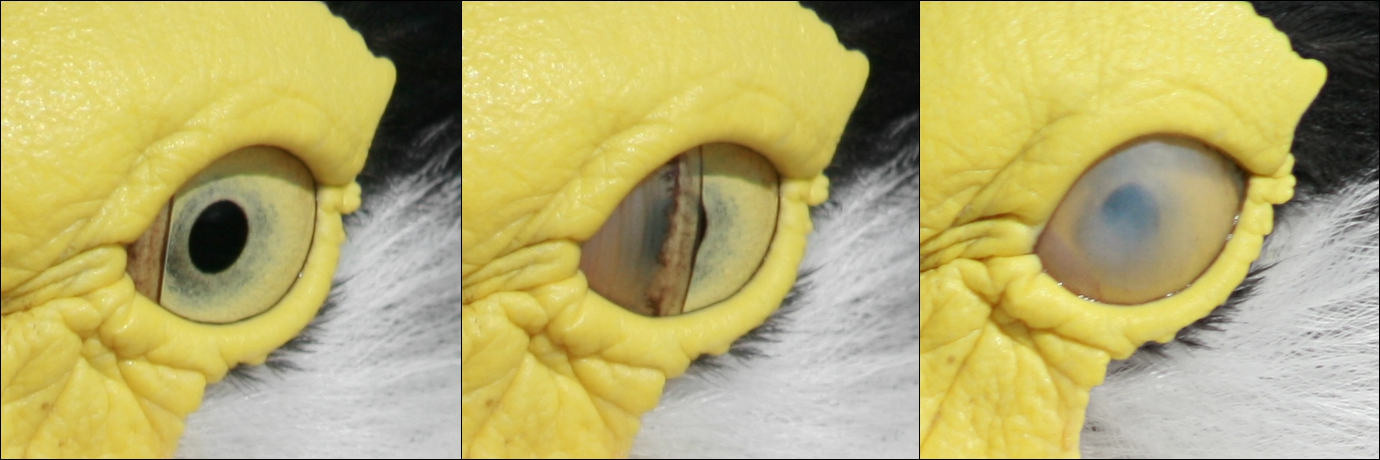
The nictitating membrane as it covers the eye of a masked lapwing

nictitating membrane
Also, third eyelid. A transparent or translucent third eyelid that is drawn across the eye for protection, to moisten it while maintaining vision. The nictitating membrane also covers the eye and acts as a contact lens in many aquatic birds. With the exception of pigeons and a few other species, most birds blink only with their nictitating membrane, and when not sleeping, use the eyelids chiefly only when the eye is threatened with some foreign matter.
nidicolous
Young that remain in their nest after hatching for an extended period of time and thus must be fed by their parents. Contrast: nidifugous.
nidifugous
Young that leave the nest soon after hatching, joining their parents in foraging. Contrast: nidicolous.
non-breeding plumage
See basic plumage.
notch
A pronounced narrowing at some variable distance along the feather edges at the outermost primaries of large soaring birds, particularly raptors. Whether these narrowings are called notches or emarginations depends on the degree of their slope. An emargination is a gradual change, and can be found on either side of the feather. A notch is an abrupt change, and is only found on the wider trailing edge of the remiges. The presence of notches and emarginations creates gaps at the wingtip; air is forced through these gaps, increasing the generation of lift.
nuptial plumage
See alternate plumage.

== O ==
oology
The scientific study of eggs.
operculum
Plural: opercula. A membraneous, horny or cartilaginous flap covering the nares of some birds. For example, in diving birds, the operculum keeps water out of the nasal cavity; when the birds dive, the impact force of the water closes the operculum.
overbrooding
The not uncommon phenomenon of birds continuing to brood eggs that are not viable and will not hatch, sometimes for lengthy periods of time beyond the normal incubation period.

== P ==
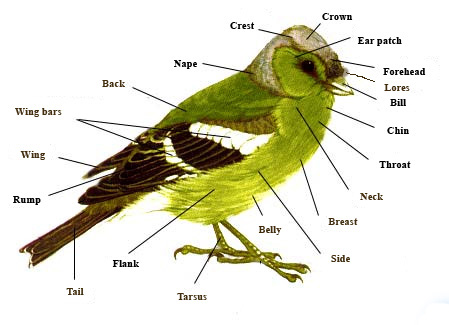
Topography of a typical passerine

passerine
Also, perching bird. Any bird of the order Passeriformes, which includes more than half of all bird species. A notable feature of passerines compared to other orders of Aves is the arrangement of their toes—three pointing forward and one back—which facilitates perching. Sometimes known as perching birds or, less accurately, as songbirds, the passerines form one of the most diverse terrestrial vertebrate orders, with over 5,000 identified species. The order has roughly twice as many species as Rodentia, the largest order of mammals. There are more than 110 families of passerine birds, the second-most of any tetrapods (after Squamata, the scaled reptiles).
pectinate claw
Also, feather comb. A claw on the middle toe of some birds, such as nightjars, herons, and barn owls, with a serrated edge. The degree of serration varies from fine to coarse, depending on the species. It is used in preening, functioning similar to a comb. Some birds may use it to straighten the rictal bristles. It may also play an important role in parasite removal. For example, a study of barn owls found a significant correlation between the number of serrated teeth on an individual's pectinate claw, and the prevalence of its lice infestation.
pectoral tuft
Elongated feathers, often brightly coloured, which arise from the sides of the chest of some species of birds, including many sunbirds, spiderhunters and flowerpeckers. They are typically hidden when the wing is folded on a perched bird, but prominent during courtship and territorial displays. In sunbirds and spiderhunters, these tufts may be yellow, red or orange; in flowerpeckers, they are usually white. The size of the tufts in some species can be an indicator of a male's fitness and status; males with larger tufts defend larger territories and have higher reproductive success.
pennaceous feather
Also, contour feather. A type of feather present in most modern birds and in some other species of maniraptoriform dinosaurs. Pennaceous feathers have a stalk called a quill, with the basal part called a calamus, that is embedded in the skin exclusively at pterylae (feather tracts). The calamus is hollow and has pith formed from the dry remains of the feather pulp. The calamus stretches between two openings—at its base is the inferior umbilicus and at its distal end is the superior umbilicus; the rachis of the main stem, hosting the vanes, continues above it. The rachides of contour feathers have an umbilical groove on their underside, with the vanes or vexilla, spreading to either side. The vanes comprise many flattened barbs, that are connected to one another by hooklets that are anchored into flanges on proximal barbules on neighboring barbs. Some specialised feathers are considered "modified" contour feathers, such as ear coverts and bird eyelashes called rictal bristles. Contrast: plumulaceous (down) feathers and filoplumes.
philopatry
The habit of a bird returning to the area it first bred.
pigeon milk
The term for crop milk when found among all pigeons and doves.
pileum
As defined in the treatise Manual of Ornithology: Avian Structure and Function, the "entire top of the head, including the forehead, crown and occipital regions".

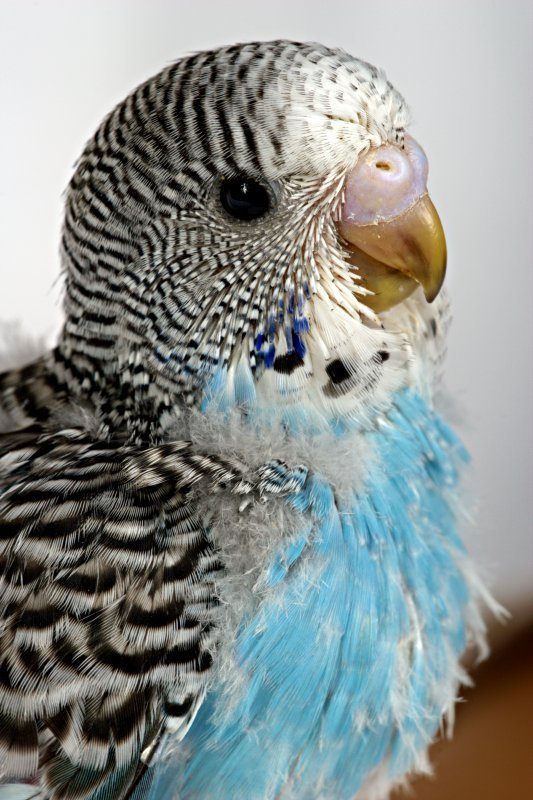
A budgerigar with pin feathers showing on its breast.

pin feather
Also, blood feather. A developing feather encased in a feather sheath that, unlike a fully developed feather, has a blood supply flowing through it. As such, damage to pin feathers can cause significant bleeding. Pin feathers may be the first feather growth during a bird's infancy, or those growing during moulting at any stage of a bird's life. As pin feather growth progresses, the blood supply is concentrated only in the base of the calamus. Pin feathers begin to develop after the feather bud invaginates a cylinder of epidermal tissue around the base of the dermal papilla, forming the feather follicle. At the base of the feather follicle, epithelial cells proliferate to grow the epidermal collar or cylinder. As the epidermal cylinder extends through dermis, it differentiates into a protective peripheral sheath, longitudinal barb ridges and growth plates. Over time these barb ridges grow in a helical manner, branching to create barbs and barbules, and fusing to form the central feather shaft. Moreover, the barb plate further differentiates into hooklets and cilia, while the marginal and axial plate die to form the intervening space within the feather structure.
pinioning
Also defined: pinion joint. The act of surgically removing one pinion joint—the joint of a bird's wing farthest from the body—thereby stopping the growth of the primary feathers, to prevent flight. The animal welfare impact of pinioning is subject to increasing debate. For example, it is known that the operation, which is often performed without pain relief, is just as painful in young birds as in mature birds, if not more so. Evidence also suggests that pinioning may cause a phantom limb syndrome similar to what is observed in human amputees.
pinions
The outermost primaries—those connected to the phalanges.

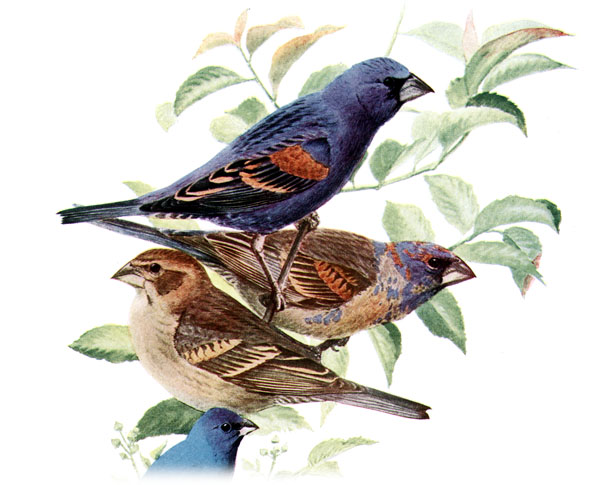
The differences in plumage of blue grosbeak, from top to bottom, between a breeding male (breeding plumage), a non-breeding male (winter plumage), a female, and a related indigo bunting

plumage
Plumage (Latin: plūma 'feather') refers both to the layer of feathers that cover a bird and the pattern, colour and arrangement of those feathers. The pattern and colours of plumage differ between species and subspecies, often vary with age and may vary sharply between males and females of the same species that exhibit sexual dimorphism. Within species there can be different colour morphs. Despite the great variance, as broad observations: 1) among many bird species adult males are more brightly coloured than are females, especially when in alternate or nuptial plumage, as opposed to basic or winter plumage; 2) when male birds undergo the prebasic moult and attain their non-breeding plumage, they much more closely resemble females; and 3) the plumage of juvenile birds (of both sexes) tends to be relatively dull and inconspicuous and typically resembles that of adult females.
plumology
Also, plumage science. The name for the science that is associated with the study of feathers.
podotheca
Also, foot sheath. Also defined: boot; reticulate; scutellate; booted. The skin that covers the bare feet and legs. It usually consists of many small scales, called scutes. This type of podotheca is described as being scutellate. When there are no scutes, and the podotheca is a smooth sheath, it is called a boot, and those with podotheca like this are called booted. The podotheca may also be reticulated with small and irregularly raised plates. This arrangement is considered to be reticulate.
powder down
Also, pulviplumes; feather dust. A special type of down that occurs in a few groups of apparently unrelated birds. In some species, the tips of the barbules on powder down feathers disintegrate, forming fine particles of keratin, which appear as a powder, or feather dust, among the feathers. These feathers grow continuously and are not moulted. In other species, the powder grains come from cells that surround the barbules of growing feathers. These specialised feathers are typically scattered among ordinary down feathers, though in some species, they occur in clusters. All parrots have powder down, with some species (including the mealy parrot) producing copious amounts. It is also found in tinamous and herons. The dust produced from powder down feathers is a known allergen in humans. Compare: body down & natal down.
post-breeding
Also, postnuptial moult (sp. variation: in the U.S., sometimes molt). Also defined: post-juvenile moult. The moult after the breeding season that most birds undergo, during which breeding plumage is shed and winter or "basic" plumage is grown. In standard terminology, the first is called the post-juvenile moult, and thereafter the 1st, 2nd, 3rd (etc.) post-breeding moult. In Humphrey–Parkes terminology, "prebasic" moults in juveniles, prior to attaining adult plumage, are numbered the 1st, 2nd, 3rd (etc.) prebasic moult. In both nomenclature systems, after adult plumage is reached, the numbering is dropped.
post-juvenile
(sp. variation: in the U.S., sometimes juvenal)
Also, postnuptial moult (sp. variation: in the U.S., sometimes molt). Also defined: post-juvenile moult. The moult after the breeding season that most birds undergo, during which nuptial plumage is shed and basic or winter plumage is grown. In standard terminology, the first is called the post-juvenile moult, and thereafter the 1st, 2nd, 3rd (etc.) postnuptial moult. In Humphrey–Parkes terminology, "prebasic" moults in juveniles, prior to attaining adult plumage, are numbered the 1st, 2nd, 3rd (etc.) prebasic moult. In both nomenclature systems, after adult plumage is reached, the numbering is dropped.
postnuptial moult
See post-breeding moult.
pre-breeding moult
Also, prenuptial moult (sp. variation: in the U.S., sometimes molt). The moult before the breeding season that many birds undergo, during which parts of the winter plumage are shed and breeding plumage is grown. "Spring moult" is also called "pre-breeding moult" or "prenuptial moult", while "Prealternate moult" is used in Humphrey–Parkes terminology. In either system of nomenclature, in juveniles this type of moult is numbered, 1st, 2nd, 3rd (etc.), until the adult plumage is attained, after which the numbering is dropped. Unlike the post-breeding moult, in the pre-breeding moult the major flight feathers and primary coverts are not replaced in most species, and the feathers involved typically are "only head and body feathers, wing coverts and sometimes tertials and rectrices".
prebasic moult
See post-juvenile moult.
precocial
Also defined: semi-precocial; altricial-precocial spectrum. Young that, at hatching, have their eyes open; are covered in down feathers (ptilopaedic); are homeothermic; and are able to leave the nest soon after hatching and join their parents in foraging activities (nidifugous). The contrasting state is altricial young, which are born "helpless"—more or less naked, blind, ectothermic and unable to leave the nest. The young of many bird species do not precisely fit into either the precocial or altricial category, having some aspects of each and thus fall somewhere on an altricial-precocial spectrum. A defined intermediate state is termed semi-precocial, typified by young born covered in down and with open eyes; that are usually able to walk shortly after hatching; but which remain mostly confined to the nest, relying on their parents for food (nidicolous).

A house sparrow cleans itself in moving water while a mallard preens in the background.

preening
Also, grooming. Feathers require maintenance and birds preen or groom them daily, spending an average of around 9% of their daily time on this activity. The bill is used to brush away foreign particles and to apply waxy secretions from the uropygial gland; these secretions protect the feathers' flexibility and act as an antimicrobial agent, inhibiting the growth of feather-degrading bacteria. This may be supplemented with the secretions of formic acid from ants, which birds receive through a behaviour known as anting, to remove feather parasites.
prenuptial moult
See pre-breeding moult.
primaries
Also, primary feathers; primary remiges. A type of remex flight feather, they are connected to the manus (the bird's "hand", composed of carpometacarpus and phalanges); these are the longest and narrowest of the remiges (particularly those attached to the phalanges), and they can be individually rotated. These feathers are especially important for flapping flight, as they are the principal source of thrust, moving the bird forward through the air. Most thrust is generated on the downstroke of flapping flight. However, on the upstroke (when the bird often draws its wing in close to its body), the primaries are separated and rotated, reducing air resistance while still helping to provide some thrust. The flexibility of the remiges on the wingtips of large soaring birds also allows for the spreading of those feathers, which helps to reduce the creation of wingtip vortices, thereby reducing drag. In most flighted birds, some of the distal barbules on the inner vane of these feathers, called friction barbules, are specialised, with large lobular barbicels that are thought to help grip and prevent slippage of overlying feathers. Species vary in the number of primaries they possess. The number in non-passerines generally varies between 9 and 11, but grebes, storks and flamingos have 12 and ostriches have 16. While most modern passerines have ten primaries, some have only nine. Those with nine are missing the most distal primary, sometimes called the remicle, which is typically very small and sometimes rudimentary in passerines.
primary projection
Also, primary extension. The distance that a bird's longest primaries extend beyond its longest secondaries (or tertials) when its wings are folded. As with wing formulae, this measurement is useful for distinguishing between similarly plumaged birds; however, unlike wing formulae, it is not necessary to have the bird in-hand to make the measurement. Rather, this is a useful relative measurement—some species have long primary extensions, while others have shorter ones. Among the Empidonax flycatchers of the Americas, for example, the dusky flycatcher has a much shorter primary extension than does the very similarly plumaged Hammond's flycatcher. Europe's common skylark has a long primary projection, while that of the near-lookalike Oriental skylark is very short. As a general rule, species which are long distance migrants will have longer primary projection than similar species which do not migrate or migrate shorter distances.
proventriculus
The first part of the stomach of a bird. The inside is lined with gastric glands, which secrete gastric juices containing enzymes and hydrochloric acid. In some birds, such as petrels, the proventriculus is expandable. This allows these birds to either digest their food later or carry it back to their young. The proventriculus leads into the gizzard.
psilopaedic
Young that are born naked or with only a small amount of down feather coverage, as opposed to birds that are ptilopaedic.
pterylae
Singular: pteryla. The feather tracts of a bird's skin from which the contour feathers grow, often in sharply defined and dense clusters—as opposed to the apterylae. See related: pterylosis.

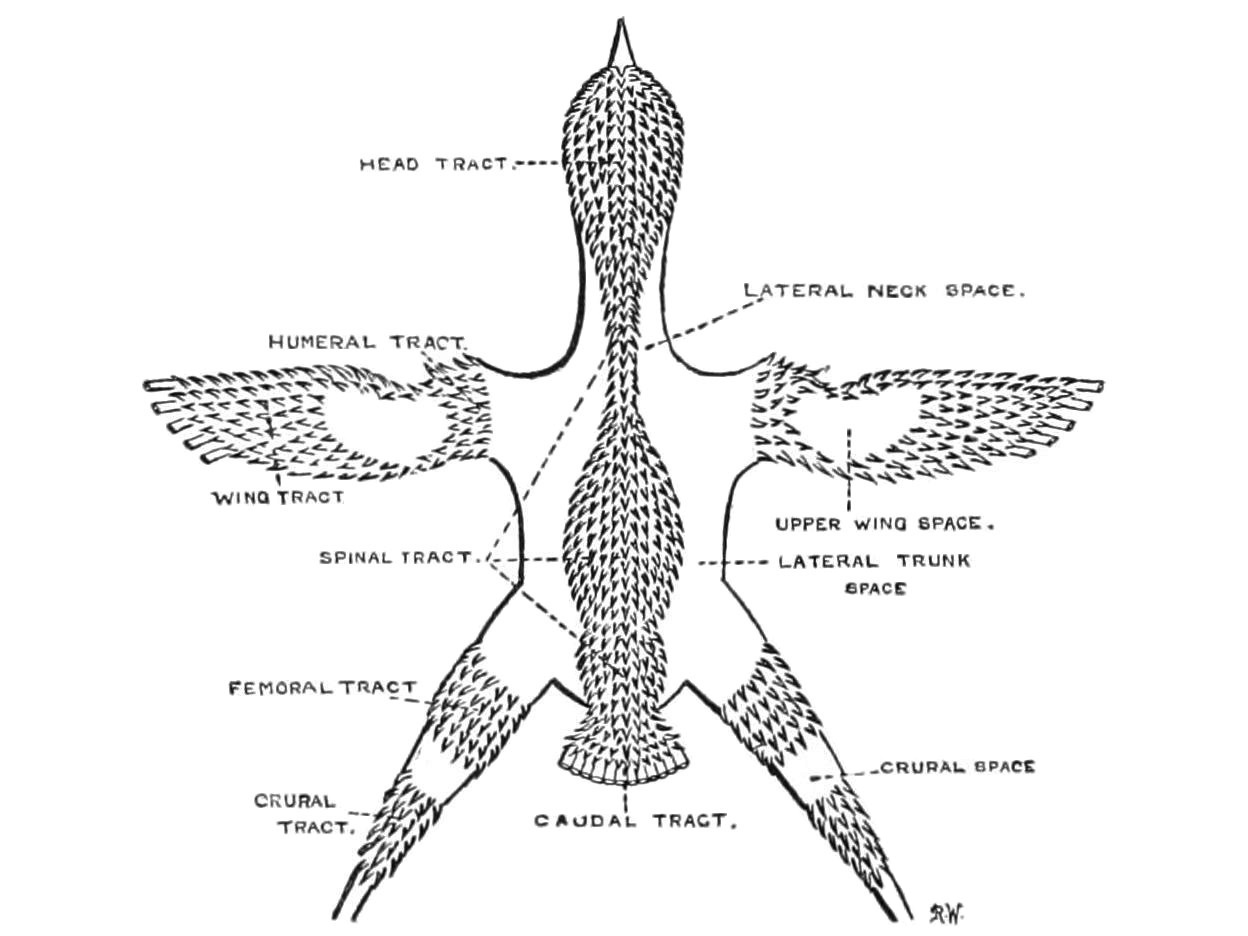
Pterylosis (feather arrangement) of a typical passerine

pterylosis
Also, pterylography. The arrangement of feather tracts, as seen in a bird's pterylae and apterylae, which varies across bird families and has been used in the past as a means for determining the evolutionary relationships among them.
ptilopaedic
Young that are born covered with down feathers, as opposed to birds that are psilopaedic.
pupil
The dark disk at the centre of a bird's eye through which light enters, surrounded by the coloured outer ring of the iris.
pygostyle
Also, tail bone. A skeletal formation, plowshare-shaped in birds, in which the final few caudal vertebrae are fused into a single ossification, supporting the tail feathers and musculature. In modern birds, the rectrices attach to these. The pygostyle is the main component of the uropygium.
pullus
(plural pulli) A chick in the downy phase of development.

== Q ==
quartering
A hunting technique where a bird flies slowly just above the water or ground in open habitats.
quill
Also, primary quill; main stem; scapus. The main stem of a feather from which all structures branch, if any. The proximal portion is called the calamus or shaft, and the distal portion is called the rachis, with the demarcation point between them usually defined as the superior umbilicus. However, some authorities define quill very differently, using it as a synonym for the calamus. The contradiction between sources on this issue is quite sharp. For example, in Asa Chandler's well known treatise, A study of the structure of feathers, with reference to their taxonomic significance, "quill" is defined at page 250 as: "The main stem of a feather, including both shaft and calamus (Coues, 1884; Beebe, 1906, et al.). Synonyms: main stem (Nitzsche, 1867)". By contrast, in Frank B. Gill's well known treatise, Ornithology, he writes at page 80: "The hollow base of the shaft—the calamus, or quill—anchors the feather in a follicle below the surface of the skin". In this glossary, the former definition will be used, treating quill as denoting the "main stem" of a feather.

== R ==
rachis
Plural: rachises; rachides. Also, shaft. Variable sp.: rhachis. Also defined: medulla. The distal or upper section of the quill, above the calamus, stretching from the superior umbilicus to the tip of the feather, upon which the vanes and other structures are anchored. The rachis is flexible from side to side toward the blade projections, but far stiffer inward and outward from the bird's body. This arrangement aids in allowing the flight feather to act as a "resilient airfoil". The rachis is composed of two layers: a pithy, opaque material makes up the core layer called the medulla, which is covered by a thin and translucent outer layer or cortex that features longitudinal internal ridges on the dorsal side and external ridges on the ventral side.
rectrices
Singular: rectrix. From the Latin for 'helmsman', they are the long, stiff, asymmetrically shaped, but symmetrically paired pennaceous feathers on the tail of a bird, which help it to brake and steer in flight. They lie in a single horizontal row on the rear margin of the anatomic tail. The vast majority of species have 12 (six pairs). They are absent in grebes and some ratites, and reduced in size in some penguins. Many grouse and snipe species have more than 12 rectrices, as does the great cormorant] with 14 rectrices, unlike other cormorants. The pintail snipe has 24 to 28 rectrices, the most of any bird; it uses these to drum in display flights. Conversely, Cetti's warbler only has ten rectrices. Some grouse species (including ruffed grouse, hazel grouse) have a number that varies among individuals. Domestic pigeons have a highly variable number, due to centuries of selective breeding.
remiges
Singular: remex. Also defined: postpatagium. From the Latin for 'oarsman', they are the long, stiff, asymmetrically shaped, but symmetrically paired pennaceous feathers on the wings of a bird. They are located on the posterior side of the wing. Ligaments attach the long calami firmly to the wing bones, and a thick, strong band of tendinous tissue known as the postpatagium helps to hold and support the remiges in place. Corresponding remiges on individual birds are symmetrical between the two wings, matching to a large extent in size and shape (except in the case of mutation or damage), though not necessarily in pattern. They are given different names depending on their position along the wing.

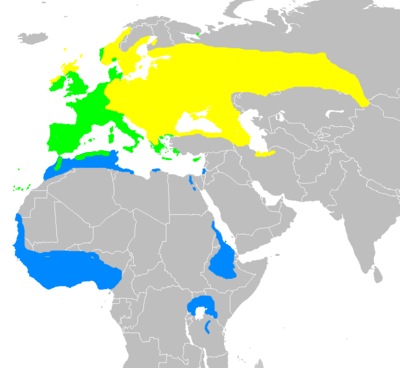
Breeding summer visitor Resident year-round Winter visitor Range map for Eurasian blackcap, corresponding to the example use of "resident" in its definition at the left

remicle
Also, little remex. The most distal primary feather. The remicle is very small and usually non-functional—interpreted by Christian Ludwig Nitzsch as "an aborted first primary". It was named by Richard S. Wray in 1887, who similarly thought of it as "representing an originally functional primary".
resident
Also, permanent resident; sedentary. Non-migratory; a bird that stays year-round and breeds in one geographic area or habitat. Both permanent resident and sedentary are common with the defined usage. Although resident is used in this sense, it is often used as well for birds that are "migratory in part of their breeding range and resident elsewhere", e.g., "Eurasian blackcaps (Sylvia atricapilla) are summer visitors to eastern and northern Europe, resident in western Europe and winter visitors to Africa".

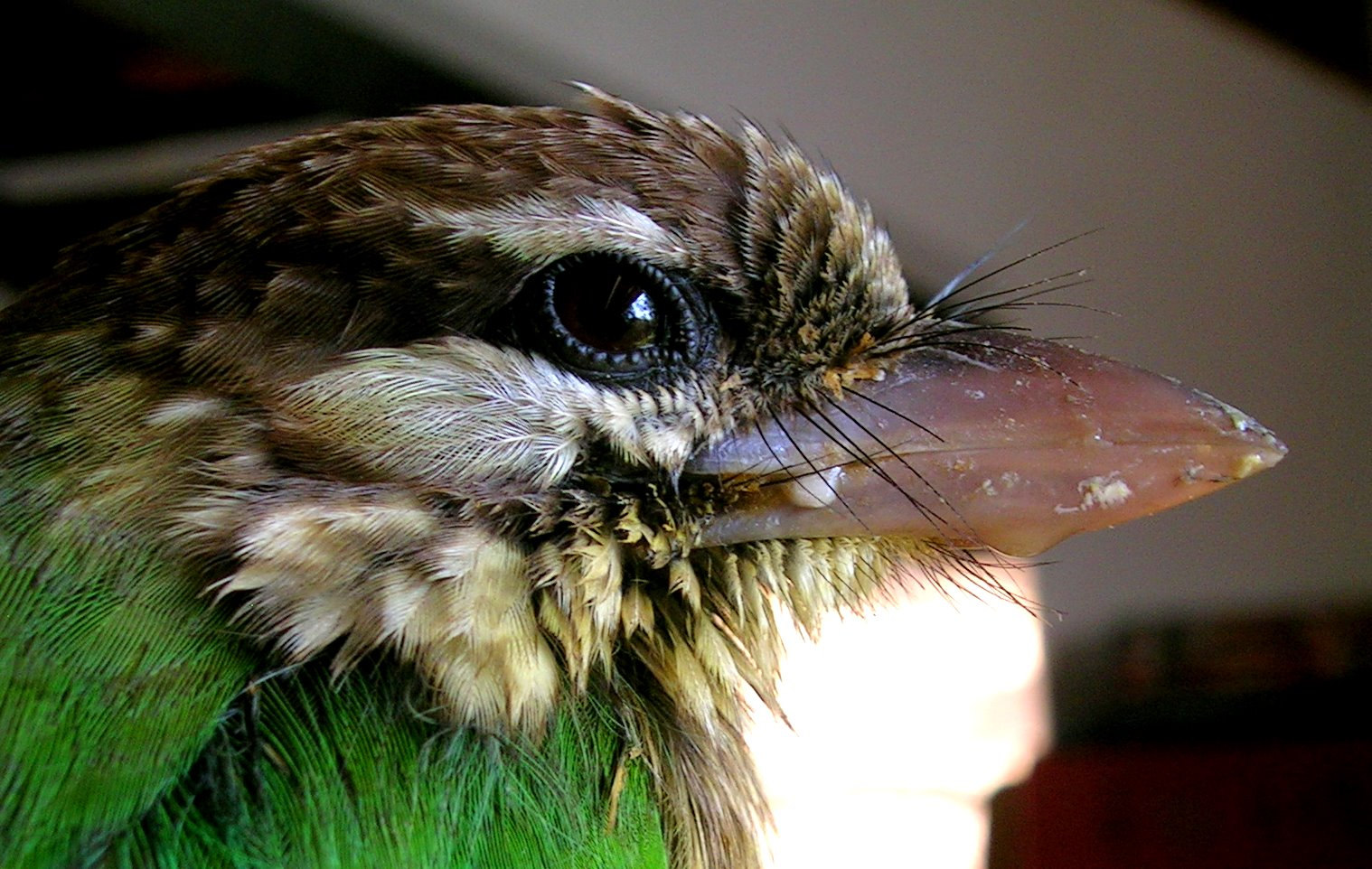
Rictal bristles of a white-cheeked barbet

rictal bristles
Also, bristles; bristle feathers; eyelashes. Stiff, hair-like, tapering feathers with a large rachis but few barbs found around the eyes and the base of the beak of some bird species. They are common among insectivorous birds, but are also found in some non-insectivorous species. They may serve a similar purpose to eyelashes and vibrissae in mammals. Although there is as yet no clear evidence, it has been suggested that rictal bristles have sensory functions and may help insectivorous birds to capture prey. There is some experimental evidence to suggest that bristles may prevent particles from striking the eyes if, for example, a prey item is missed or breaks apart upon contact.
rosette
Also, gape rosette. A fleshy rosette found at the corners of the beaks of some birds, such as the puffin. In the puffin, this is grown as part of its display plumage.
rhamphotheca
The outer surface of the beak consisting of a thin horny sheath of keratin, which can be subdivided into the rhinotheca of the upper mandible and the gnathotheca of the lower mandible. This covering arises from the Malpighian layer of the bird's epidermis, growing from plates at the base of each mandible. There is a vascular layer between the rhamphotheca and the deeper layers of the dermis, which is attached directly to the periosteum of the bones of the beak. The rhamphotheca grows continuously in most birds, and in some species, the colour varies seasonally.
rhinotheca
The rhamphotheca (thin horny sheath of keratin) covering the upper mandible.
rhynchokinesis
See cranial kinesis.
rump
Also, uropygium; uropygial region; parson's nose, pope's nose; sultan's nose. Topographically, the region of a bird's upperparts between the end of the back and the base of the tail. Anatomically, the fleshy protuberance visible at the posterior end of a bird. Its swollen appearance results from it housing the uropygial gland. See related: pygostyle.

== S ==
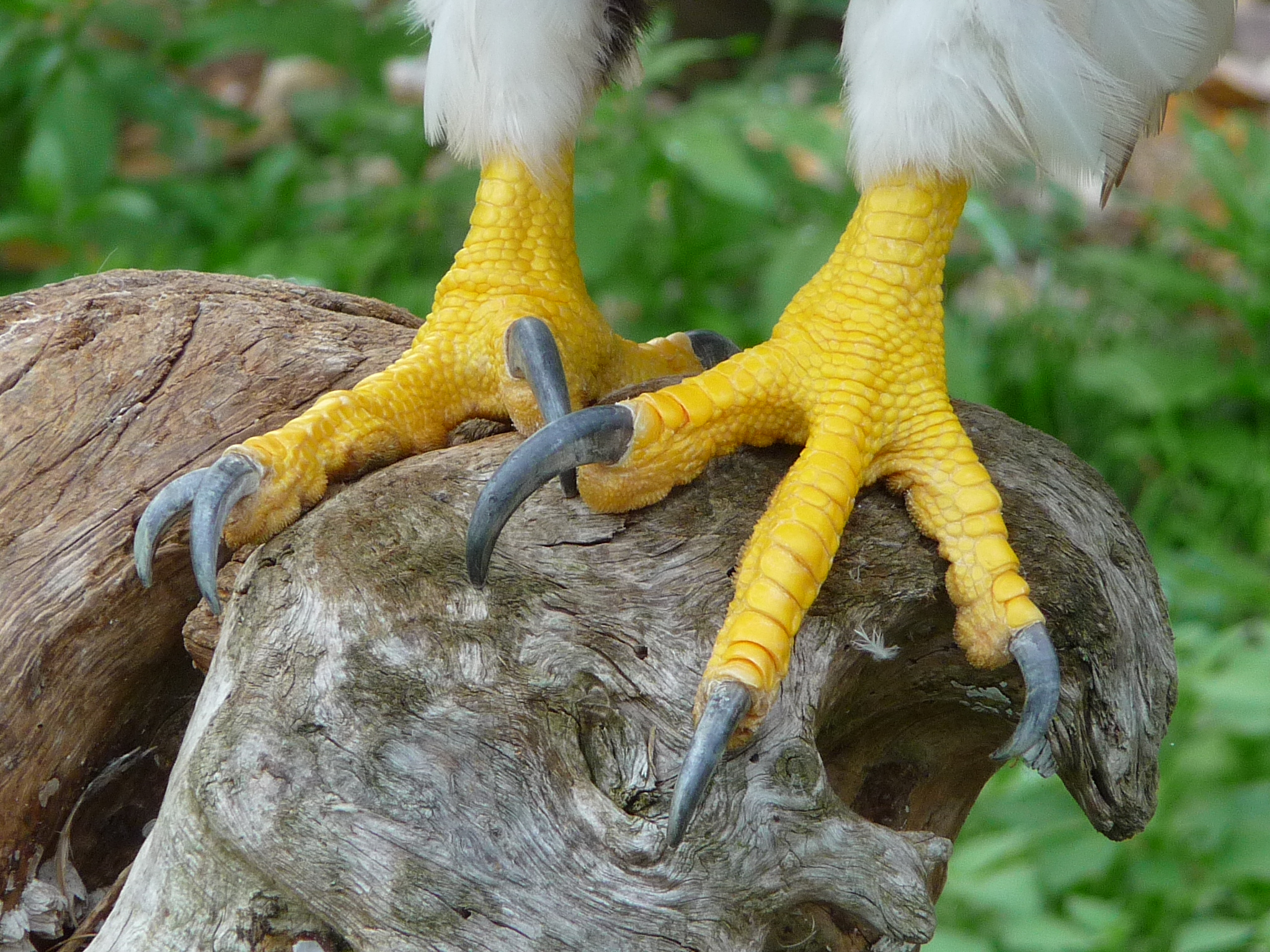
Scales on the talons of a Steller's sea eagle (Haliaeetus pelagicus)

scales
Specialised types: cancella; scutella; scutes. Also defined: reticulae; acrometatarsium / acrotarsium. The scales of birds are composed of keratin like their beaks and claws, and are found mainly on the toes and metatarsus, though they may appear further up on the ankle. They do not overlap significantly, except in the cases of kingfishers and woodpeckers. The scales and scutes of birds were originally thought to be homologous to those of reptiles and mammals; later research, however, suggests that scales in birds re-evolved after the evolution of feathers. Bird embryos begin development with smooth skin. On the feet, the corneum, or outermost layer of this skin may keratinise, thicken and form scales. Bird scales can be organised into:
i) cancella, minute scales which are really just a thickening and hardening of the skin, crisscrossed with shallow grooves;
ii) scutella, scales that are not quite as large as scutes, such as those found on the caudal, or hind part, of the chicken metatarsus; and
iii) scutes, the largest scales, usually on the anterior surface of the metatarsus and dorsal surface of the toes. The rows of scutes on the anterior of the metatarsus is sometimes termed an "acrometatarsium" or "acrotarsium".
Reticulae, by contrast, are small, keeled scale-like structures covering the bottoms of bird feet, but are not true scales. Evolutionary developmental studies on reticulae found that they are composed entirely of alpha-keratin (whereas, true epidermal scales are composed of a mix of alpha and beta keratin). This, along with their unique structure, has led to the suggestion that reticulae are actually feather buds that were arrested early in development. See also: podotheca.
scapulars
Also, humeral region. Feathers covering a bird's scapula "at the base of the dorsal wing".
secondaries
Also, secondary feathers; secondary remiges. A type of remex flight feather, they are connected to the ulna. In some but not all bird species, the ligaments that bind secondaries to the bone connect to small, rounded projections that are called quill knobs. Secondary feathers remain close together in flight (they cannot be individually separated like the primaries can) and help to provide lift by creating the airfoil shape of the bird's wing. Secondaries tend to be shorter and broader than primaries, with blunter ends. They vary in number from six in hummingbirds, to as many as 40 in some species of albatross. In general, larger and longer-winged species have a larger number of secondaries. Birds in more than 40 non-passerine families are missing the fifth secondary feather on each wing; a state known as diastataxis.
semiplume
Also, semiplume feather. A type of feather that has features straddling the differences between true down and contour feathers, such as by lacking cross-attachment between their barbs (i.e., without a flange–hooklet anchoring system), but having a central, full-length shaft as in contour feathers. They are usually found on the margins of the pennaceous feather tracts and, like down, provide insulative qualities and help fill out the plumage. Crest feathers are a type of semiplume.

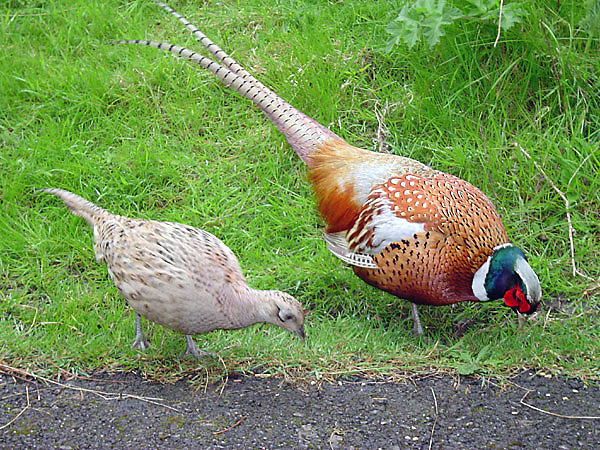
Sexually dimorphic female (left) and male (right) common pheasant, illustrating the dramatic difference in both colour and size between the species' sexes

sexual dimorphism
The common phenomenon amongst birds in which males and females of the same species exhibit different characteristics beyond the differences in their sexual organs. It can manifest in size or plumage differences. Sexual size dimorphism varies among taxa with males typically being larger, though this is not always the case, i.e., in birds of prey, hummingbirds and some species of flightless birds. Plumage dimorphism, in the form of ornamentation or colouration, also varies, though males are typically the more ornamented or brightly coloured sex. Such differences have been attributed to the unequal reproductive contributions of the sexes.
shaft
See entry for rachis.
sides
The topographical area between the breast and the back, stretching from the axilla (underarm) to the Iliac crest.
song
A type of bird vocalisation associated with courtship and mating, tending to be longer and more complex than a bird's call, which serve such functions as giving alarm or keeping members of a flock in contact.

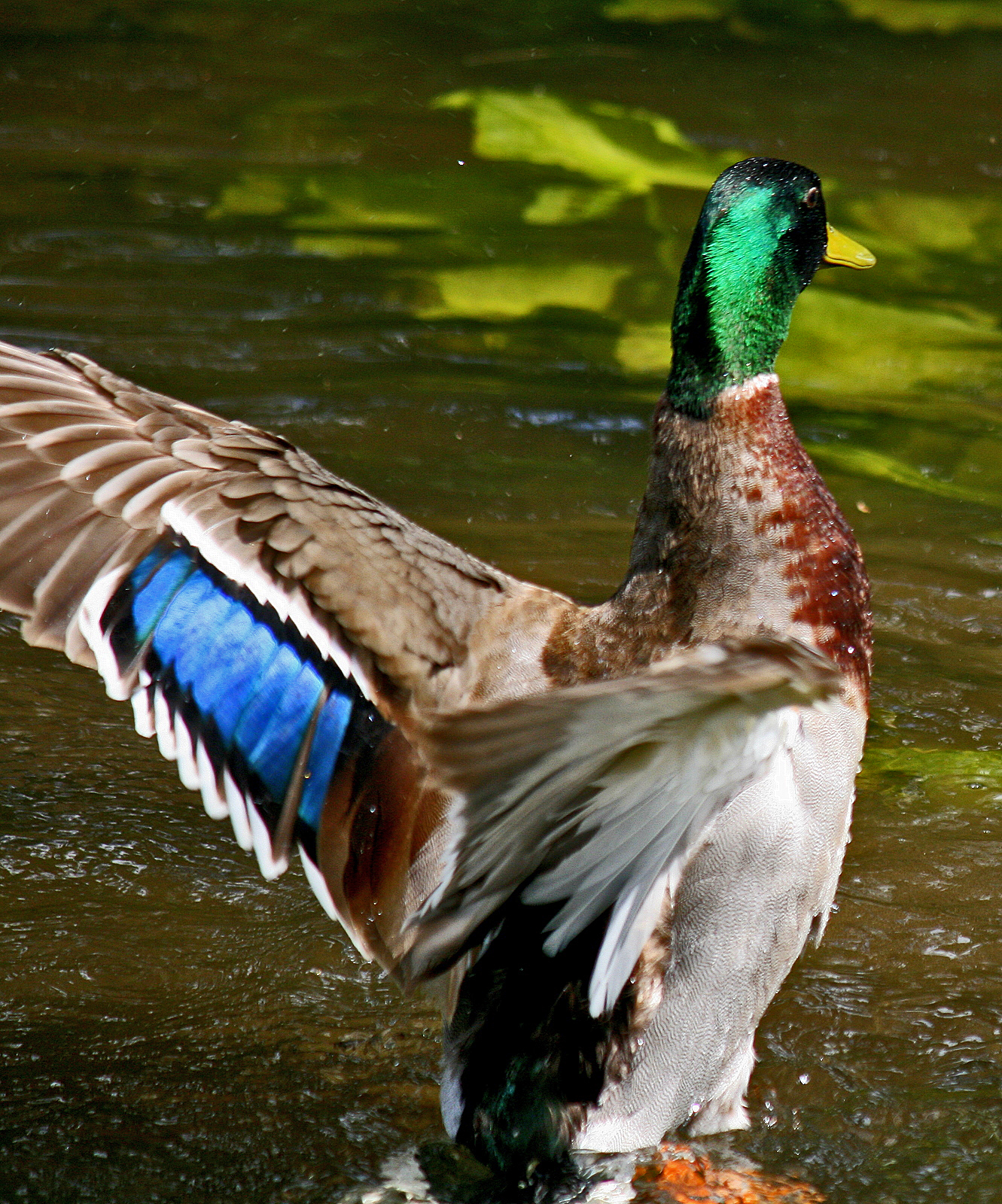
A male mallard. Note the white-edged, blue and black speculum seen on the wing.

speculum
Also, speculum feathers; mirror. A patch of usually brightly coloured feathers, often iridescent, on the inner secondary remiges in a number of duck species, though other birds may have them, such as the bright red or orange wing speculum of several parrots from the genus Amazona.
spur
Outgrowths of bone covered in a sheath of horn which are found on some birds. Spurs are most commonly found on the feet or legs, though some birds possess spurs on the leading edge of the wings.
sternum
Plural: sterna. The breastbone of a bird. There are two types: i) carinate sterna—appearing in flighted birds, in which the ventral surface is keel-shaped, which provides ample surface area for attachment of wing muscles used for flight; and ii) ratite sterna—appearing in flightless birds, such as rhea, in which the ventral surface is flattened.
submoustachial stripe
A usually light stripe of colour between the moustachial stripe above, and the lateral throat-stripe below.
supercilium
Plural: supercilia. Also, superciliary line; eyebrow / eye brow. A pale line appearing above the eye of a bird. Compare eye stripe.
superior umbilicus
Also, distal umbilicus. A very small opening on the ventral side (facing toward the bird's skin) of a feather's shaft, marking the distal end of the calamus and the start of the rachis. It is a remnant of the epithelial tube used by a bird's body to construct the feather. Compare: inferior umbilicus.
supraloral
Where a stripe is present only above the lores, and does not continue behind the eye, it is called a supraloral stripe or simply supraloral, rather than the supercilium.
syrinx
From the Greek word for pan pipes, σύριγξ, it is the vocal organ of birds. Located at the base of a bird's trachea, it produces sounds without the vocal folds of mammals. As air flows through the syrinx, sound is produced by the vibration of some or all of the membrana tympaniformis (the walls of the syrinx) and a bar of cartilage connecting the dorsal and ventral extremities, known as the pessulus. This sets up a self-oscillating system that regulates the airflow used to create vocalizations. Sound modulation is achieved by varying the tension of muscles connected to the membranes and bronchial openings involved. The syrinx enables some species of birds (such as parrots, crows and mynas) to mimic human speech. Unlike the mammalian larynx, the syrinx is located where the trachea forks into the lungs. Thus, lateralization of bird song is possible, and some songbirds can produce more than one sound at a time.

== T ==
tail
While the underlying structure of the tail is made up of bone (the pygostyle) and flesh, the term "tail" is most commonly used to refer to the feathers growing from the region and the shape they form—that is, undertail and uppertail coverts and rectrices, commonly radiating in a fan configuration.
tail coverts
See: undertail coverts, uppertail coverts and crissum.

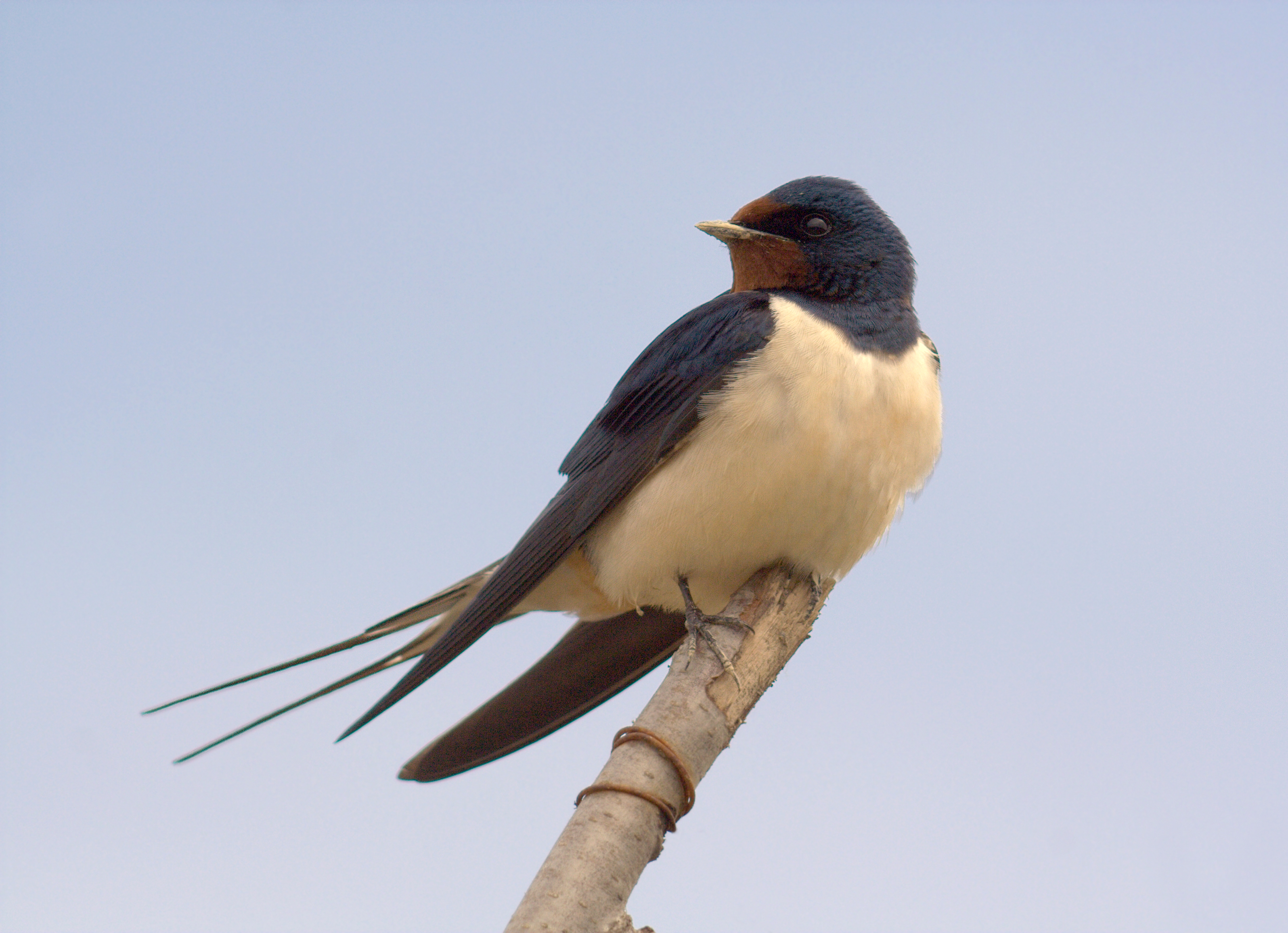
A barn swallow displaying tail streamers

tail streamers
The elongated, narrow tips of the tail seen in some birds. They generally function as a sexual ornament. In the barn swallow, this has resulted in tail streamers about 12 mm (0.47 in) longer than is aerodynamically optimal.
talon
The claw of a bird of prey; its primary hunting tool. The talons are very important; without them, most birds of prey would not be able to catch their food. Some birds also use claws for defensive purposes. Cassowaries use claws on their inner toe (digit II) for defence, and have been known to disembowel people. All birds, however, have claws, which are used as general holdfasts and protection for the tip of the digits. The hoatzin and turaco are unique among extant birds in having functional claws on the thumb and index finger (digit I and II) on the forelimbs as chicks, allowing them to climb trees until the adult plumage with flight feathers develop. However, several birds have a claw- or nail-like structure hidden under the feathers at the end of the hand digits, notably ostriches, emus, ducks, geese and kiwis.

Pigeon skeleton. Number 8 indicates both left and right tarsometatarsus

tarsus
Also defined: tarsometatarsus. The third and most conspicuous portion of the bird's leg, from which the toes spring; the foot. In birds, the true tarsus has disappeared, with the proximal tarsals having fused with the tibia, the centralia having disappeared, and the distal bones having fused with the metatarsals to form a single tarsometatarsus bone, effectively giving the leg a third segment.
teleoptiles
The collective term for all of the feathers of an adult bird.
temporal canthus
The area where the eyelids come together at the posterior corner of the eye (toward the sides of the head), as opposed to the nasal canthus.
tertiaries
Also, tertials; tertiary feathers; humeral feathers. A type of feather arising in the brachial region, i.e., "proximal to the innermost secondaries", usually growing in a grouping of three to four feathers. They are not considered true remiges as they are not supported by attachment to the corresponding bone—in this case the humerus. These elongated "true" tertials act as a protective cover for all or part of the folded primaries and secondaries, and do not qualify as flight feathers as such. However, many authorities use the term tertials to refer to the shorter, more symmetrical innermost secondaries of passerines (arising from the olecranon and performing the same function as true tertials) in an effort to distinguish them from other secondaries. The term humeral is sometimes used for birds such as the albatrosses and pelicans that have a long humerus.
throat
The triangular area of a bird's external anatomy, typically feathered, located between the chin and the upper part of the breast.
thigh
The topographical area between the "knee" and the trunk of the body.
tibia
The usually feathered part of a bird's leg extending above the foot (tarsus).

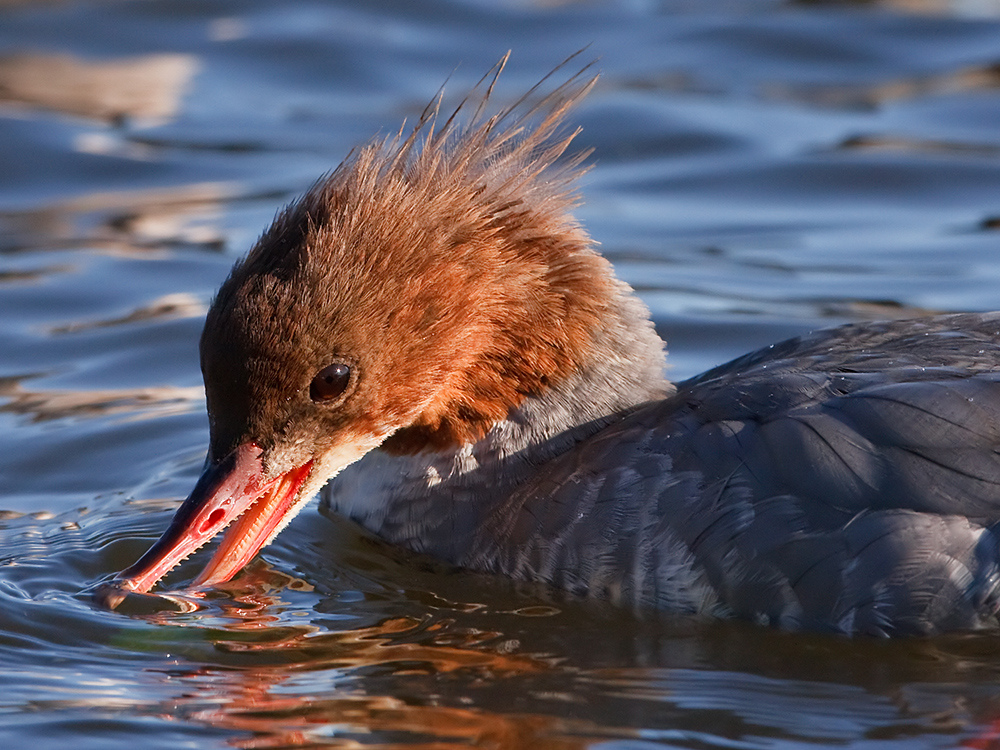
The sawtooth serrations of a common merganser's tomia help it to hold tight to its fish prey.

tomia
Singular: tomium. The cutting edges of the upper and lower mandibles. In most birds, these range from rounded to slightly sharp, but some species have evolved structural modifications that allow them to handle their typical food sources better. Granivorous (seed-eating) birds, for example, have ridges in their tomia, which help the bird to slice through a seed's outer hull. Birds in roughly 30 families have tomia lined with tight bunches of very short bristles along their entire length. Most of these species are either insectivores (preferring hard-shelled prey) or snail eaters, and the brush-like projections may help to increase the coefficient of friction between the mandibles, thereby improving the bird's ability to hold hard prey items. Serrations on hummingbird bills, found in 23% of all hummingbird genera, may perform a similar function, allowing the birds to effectively hold insect prey. They may also allow shorter-billed hummingbirds to function as nectar thieves, as they can more effectively hold and cut through long or waxy flower corollas. In some cases, the colour of a bird's tomia can help to distinguish between similar species. The snow goose, for example, has a reddish-pink bill with black tomia, while the whole beak of the similar Ross's goose is pinkish-red, without darker tomia.
topography
The mapping of external features of bird anatomy.
torpor
Also, hypometabolism. An energy-conserving strategy used by some small birds [under 100 g (3.5 oz)] in which they become inactive and unreactive to external stimuli, and reduce their metabolism below their normal respiration and heart rate, causing decreases in body temperature by an average of 4–35 °C (39–95 °F). Two types of torpor are recognised. In one type, such as in hummingbirds, torpor may be entered on a daily basis and last only a few hours; other behaviour, such as foraging, continue during non-torpor periods. For other species, torpor may only be entered during cold conditions or when food becomes limited, but may persist for weeks or even months. The extent of unresponsiveness during torpor can be pronounced. A hummingbird in deep torpor, for example, with a body temperature of 18 °C (64 °F), will not respond to a variety of external stimuli, such as attempts to push it from a perch; only the locking reflex of the feet stops the bird from falling. Torpor has been reported in eight orders of birds.

== U ==
undertail coverts
Covert feathers covering the base of the tail on its underside. Compare: uppertail coverts; contrast wing coverts.

Underwing of bird showing feather nomenclature: 1 axillaries, 2 margin (marginal underwing coverts), 3 lesser underwing coverts, 4 median underwing coverts (secondary coverts), 5 greater underwing coverts (secondary coverts), 6 carpal joint, 7 lesser underwing primary coverts, 8 greater underwing primary coverts, 9 secondaries, 10 primaries

underwing
The bottom side of a bird's wing; the hidden surface of the wing when it is folded. Compare: upperwing.
upper mandible
Also, maxilla. The upper part of a bird's bill or beak, roughly corresponding to the upper jaw of mammals, it is supported by a three-pronged bone called the intermaxillary. The upper prong of this bone is embedded into the forehead, while the two lower prongs attach to the sides of the skull. At the base of the upper mandible a thin sheet of nasal bones is attached to the skull at the nasofrontal hinge, which gives mobility to the upper mandible, allowing it to move upwards and downwards. The outer surface is covered in a thin, horny sheath of keratin called rhamphotheca specially called rhinotheca in the upper mandible. Compare: lower mandible.
upper parts
Also, upper-parts and upperparts. The topographical areas above the eyes of a bird (generally not including the eyestripe, if any) and through all of a bird's upper surface, including the "crown, mantle, back, tertials and inner wing-coverts", although the term is sometimes used more inclusively, for all features from the bill to the tail. Compare: under parts.
under parts
Also, under-parts; underparts; lower parts; lower-parts; lowerparts. All topographical areas on the underside or "under surface" of a bird, i.e., from the chin to the underside end of the tail (on the trunk and thus not including the legs). Compare upper parts.
uppertail coverts
Covert feathers covering the base of the tail on its upperside. Sometimes these coverts are more specialised. The "tail" of a peacock are actually very elongated uppertail coverts. Compare undertail coverts; contrast wing coverts.
upperwing
The top, or upper, side of a bird's wing. Compare: underwing.
uropygial gland
Also, preen gland; oil gland. A gland found at the rump, at the base of the tail that produces a waxy secretion made up of oils, fatty acids, fats and water that the majority of birds use in daily preening of their feathers. Though feathers moult periodically, they are inert structures without a nourishment system and would deteriorate rapidly without such application during preening. The applied waxy secretion aids in waterproofing, helps maintain feather moistness to keep them from becoming brittle and maintain flexibility, and is thought to promote the growth of nonpathogenic fungi, to deter feather lice and some forms of keratin-eating fungi and bacteria. The gland, a bilobed structure, is usually surrounded by a tuft of downy feathers that can act like a wick for the secreted oils.
uropygium
See rump.

== V ==
vagrant
Descriptive of a bird found outside its species' or subspecies' normal migration range or distribution area.
vane
Also, vexillum – plural: vexilla. The weblike expanse of flexible barbs, more or less interconnected by the hooklets of the barbules, extending from each side of the distal part of the feather's shaft known as the rachis. One side of the vane, called the outer vane, overlaps the inner vane side of the feather next to it.
vanule
The collective term for all of the barbules branching from the ramus of a feather's barb.
vaned feather
A classification term for pennaceous feathers (aka contour feathers) that clothe the outside of a bird's body. It refers to the vaned property of such feathers, i.e., having a flattened weblike expanse of flexible barbs, more or less interconnected by the hooklets of the barbules, extending from each side of the distal part of the feather's shaft known as the rachis. They make up one of three broad classes of feathers, the others being down feathers (which lie underneath vaned feathers, if present), and the hairlike filoplumes.
vent
The external opening of the cloaca.
vent pecking
An abnormal behaviour of birds in captivity, performed primarily by commercial egg-laying hens, characterised by pecking damage to the cloaca, the surrounding skin and underlying tissue. Vent pecking frequently occurs immediately after an egg has been laid when the cloaca often remains partly everted exposing the mucosa.

== W ==
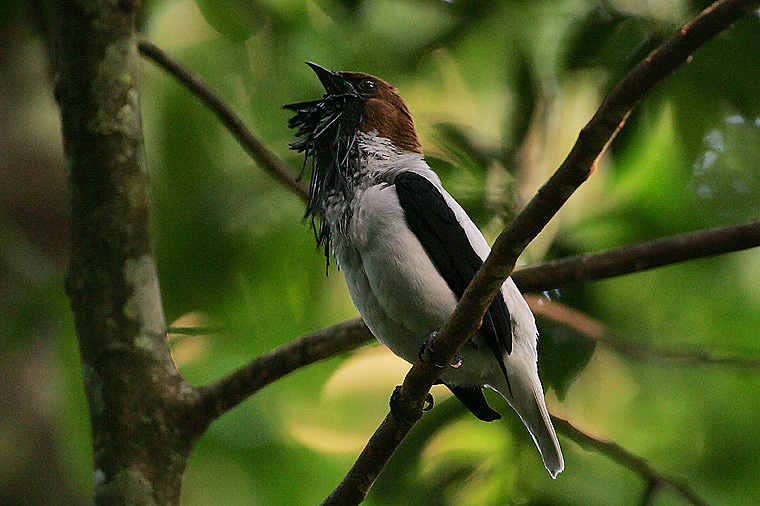
An adult male bearded bellbird calling in the Arima Valley of Trinidad. Note the beard-like wattles sprouting from its chin and throat area, for which the bird is named.

wattle
Also, dewlap; lappet; palearia. Specialised type: rictal wattle. A type of caruncle, the wattle is a flap or lobe of flesh, often of a vivid colour, that hangs from the head of some birds, often from the chin or throat. When found at the corner of the mouth, they may be called rictal wattles, such as in masked lapwings. Birds with wattles include turkeys, guineafowls, northern cassowaries, black-faced ibises, North Island kōkakos, wattled starlings (males, when in nuptial plumage) and male bearded bellbirds, with the last having startling, beard-like wattles.
whiffling
A flight behaviour in which a bird rapidly descends with a zig-zagging, side-slipping motion. During whiffling, some birds invert the aerodynamic mechanics of their bodies that normally provide lift—flying by turning their bodies upside down but with their necks twisted 180 degrees to keep their heads in a normal flying position—resulting in a rapid plummet, before a quick arrest of the fall by resumption of a normal flying orientation.

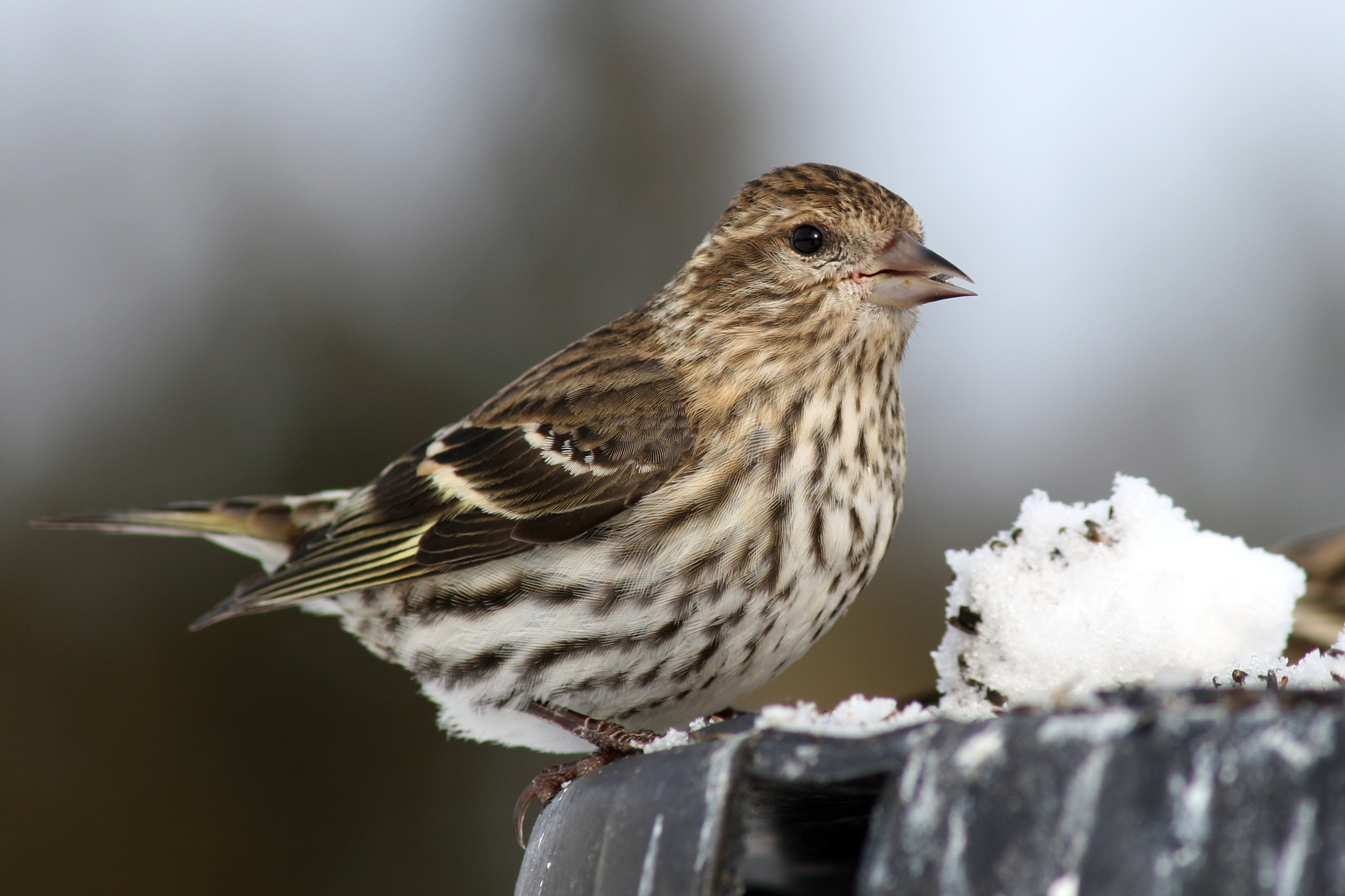
A female pine siskin with white wing bars.

wing bar
A stripe found on the upperwing that is created by the contrast of the tips of the primary and secondary coverts. This feature may disappear when a bird moults and takes on a different seasonal plumage. Wing bars often occur in pairs. Contrast: speculum.
wing clipping
Also, wing trimming. The controversial practice of trimming a bird's primary wing feathers or remiges so that it is not fully flight-capable, until it grows replacement feathers during its next moult. If it is performed correctly, it is a painless procedure. Nevertheless, the practice can cause injury, e.g., haemorrhaging as the result of blood feathers being accidentally trimmed.

Topside of a chicken wing showing all major feather groups

wing coverts
Also defined: upperwing coverts; underwing coverts; secondary coverts; primary coverts; greater (primary-/secondary-) coverts; median (primary-/secondary-) coverts; lesser (primary-/secondary-) coverts (the last being also called bow coverts).
Covert feathers found on a bird's wing. There are a number of classes and subclasses. The upperwing coverts fall into two groups: those on the inner wing, which overlay the secondary flight feathers, are known as the secondary coverts, and those on the outer wing, which overlay the primary flight feathers, are known as the primary coverts. Within each group, the feathers form a number of rows. The feathers of the outermost, largest, row are termed greater (primary-/secondary-) coverts; those in the next row are the median (primary-/secondary-) coverts, and any remaining rows are termed lesser (primary-/secondary-) coverts. The underwing has corresponding sets of coverts (the names upperwing coverts and underwing coverts are used to distinguish the corresponding sets). In addition, the front edge of the wing is covered with a group of feathers called the marginal coverts. Within each group of wing coverts, the rows of feathers overlap each other like roof tiles (the greater coverts are overlain by the median coverts, which in turn are overlain by the outermost row of lesser coverts, and so on). See also: axillaries; ear coverts; wing lining (marginal coverts).
wing formula
A mathematical classification of the shape of the distal end of a bird's wing. It can be used to help distinguish between species with similar plumages, and thus is particularly useful for those who ring (band) birds. To determine a bird's wing formula, the exposed distance between the tip of the most distal primary, and the tip of its greater covert (the longest of the feathers that cover and protect the shaft of that primary), is measured in millimetres. In some cases, this results in a positive number (e.g., the primary extends beyond its greater covert), while in other cases it is a negative number (e.g., the primary is completely covered by the greater covert, as happens in some passerine species). Next, the longest primary feather is identified, and the differences in millimetres is measured between: i) the length of that primary; ii) that of all of the remaining primaries; and iii) of the longest secondary. If any primary shows a notch or emargination, this is noted, and the distance between the feather's tip and any notch is measured, as is the depth of the notch. All distance measurements are made with the bird's wing closed, so as to maintain the relative positions of the feathers. While there can be considerable variation across members of a species—and while the results are obviously impacted by the effects of moult and feather regeneration—even very closely related species show clear differences in their wing formulae.
wing lining
Also, marginal coverts. A grouping of very soft covert feathers lining the anterior edge of the underside of the wing. Though the wing lining is composed of rows of these feathers, they are smooth in appearance such that it is often impossible to see the demarcation of the rows solely by eye.
wings
Wing types defined: elliptical; high speed; high aspect ratio; soaring. The bird's forelimbs that are the key to flight. Each wing has a central axis, composed of three limb bones: the humerus, ulna and radius. The hand, or manus, which ancestrally was composed of five digits, is reduced to three digits (digit II, III and IV or I, II, III depending on the scheme followed), which serves as an anchor for the primaries, one of two groups of flight feathers responsible for the wing's airfoil shape. The other set of flight feathers, behind the carpal joint on the ulna, are called the secondaries. The remaining feathers on the wing are known as coverts, of which there are three sets. The wing sometimes has vestigial claws. In most species these are lost by the time the bird is adult (such as the highly visible ones used for active climbing by hoatzin chicks), but claws are retained into adulthood by the secretarybird, screamers, finfoots, ostriches, several swifts and numerous others, as a local trait, in a few specimens. Bird wings are generally grouped into four types: i) elliptical wings—short, rounded and having a low aspect ratio, they allow for tight maneuvering in confined spaces such as might be found in dense vegetation. They are common in forest raptors, many migratory species of passerines, and in species such as pheasants and partridges that use a rapid take-off to evade predators. ii) High speed wings—short, pointed wings that, when combined with a heavy wing loading and rapid wingbeats, provide an energetically expensive high speed, as used by the bird with the fastest wing speed, the peregrine falcon. Most ducks and auks have this type of wing but use the configuration for a different purpose, to "fly" underwater. iii) High aspect ratio wings—typified by low wing loading and being far longer than they are wide, they are used for slower flight, which may take the form of almost hovering (as used by kestrels, terns and nightjars), or in soaring and gliding flight, particularly the dynamic soaring used by seabirds, which takes advantage of wind speed variation at different altitudes (wind shear) above ocean waves to provide lift. iv) Soaring wings with deep slots—common in larger species of inland birds, such as eagles, vultures, pelicans and storks. The slots at the end of the wings, between the primaries, reduce the induced drag and wingtip vortices, while the shorter size of the wings aids in takeoff (high aspect ratio wings require a long taxi to get airborne).

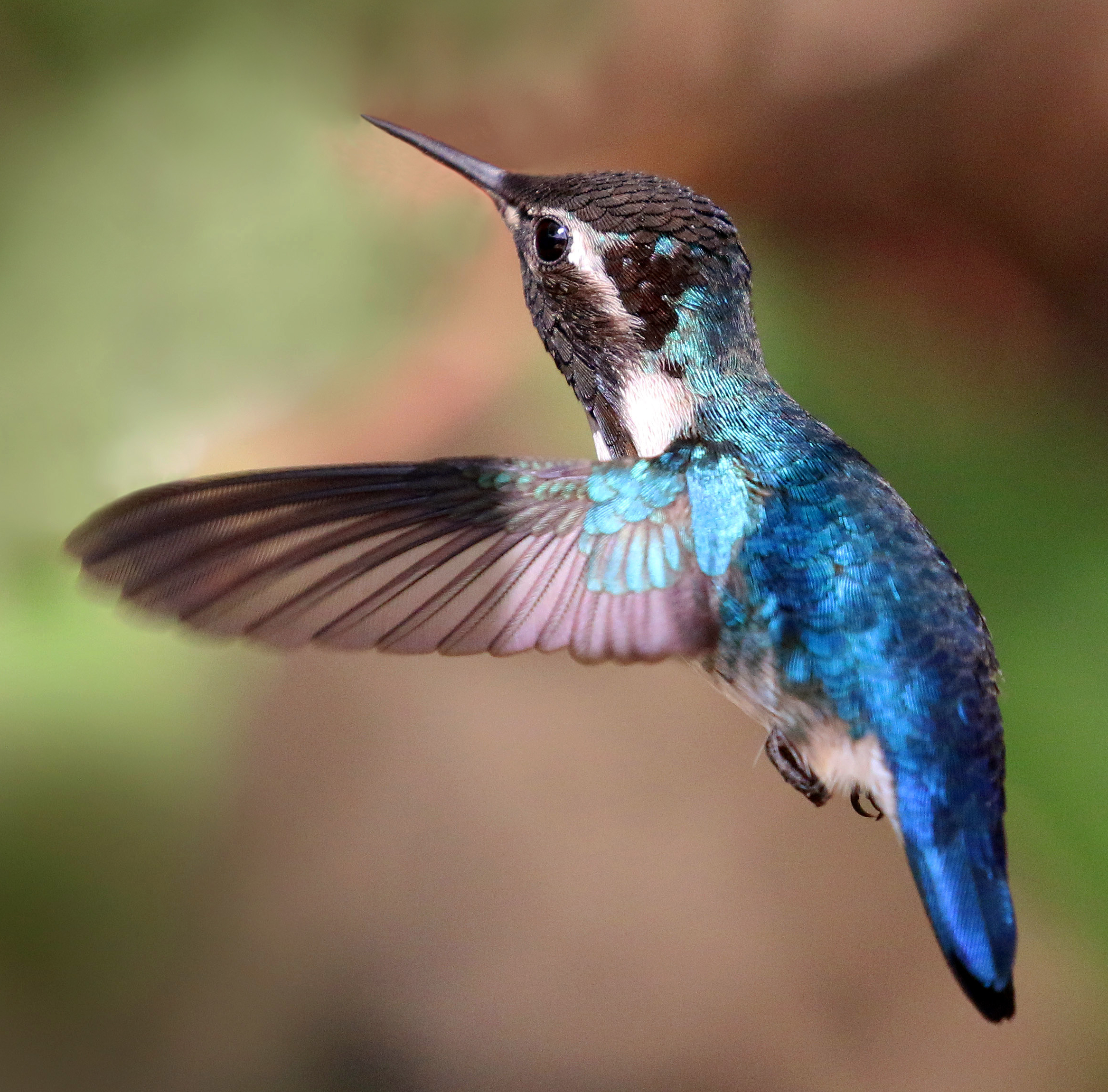
Male bee hummingbird in flight; the bird with the smallest wingspan at 6.6 cm (2.6 in).

wingspan
The distance between each of the tips of the fully extended wings. The living bird species with the largest wingspan is the wandering albatross, typically ranging from 2.5 to 3.5 m (8 ft 2 in to 11 ft 6 in). In contrast, the living bird species with the smallest wingspan is the bee hummingbird (also the smallest bird overall) with a wingspan of just 6.6 cm (2.6 in).
winter plumage
Also, basic plumage; non-breeding plumage. Also defined: supplementary plumage. The plumage of birds during the non-breeding season. It results from the post-breeding moult that many birds undergo just after the breeding season, and sometimes (rarely) even a second non-breeding season moult (resulting in what is sometimes termed "supplementary plumage") prior to the next breeding season. (Note: Birds that undergo a second, non-breeding season moult (third moult overall) include: ptarmigan (Lagopus) (in the summer); long-tailed duck (Clangula hyemalis) (in the winter); ruff (Calidris pugnax) (in the late winter or early spring); and may occur in other members of the sandpiper (Scolopacidae) family.) The winter plumage is commonly duller than the breeding or nuptial plumage.

== Z ==
zygodactylous
Also, yoke-toed. Also defined: heterodactylous. Descriptive of tetradactyl (four-toed) birds in which the architecture of the foot consists of two toes projecting forward and two toes projecting backward, such as in parrots, woodpeckers and cuckoos. In most birds with zygodactylous feet, the forward projecting toes are the second and third toes and the backward projecting toes are the fourth toe and hallux. However, in trogons alone, the third and fourth toes are in front, and the second and hallux are behind. This arrangement is sometimes separately designated, and termed heterodactylous.

== See also ==
- Glossary of dinosaur anatomy

== Bibliography ==
- Bird, David Michael (2004). The Bird Almanac: A Guide to Essential Facts and Figures of the World's Birds. Firefly Books. ISBN 978-1-55297-925-9.
- Campbell, Bruce; Lack, Elizabeth, eds. (1985). A Dictionary of Birds. Carlton, England: T and A D Poyser. ISBN 978-0-85661-039-4.
- Carnaby, Trevor (2008). Beat about the Bush: Birds. Johannesburg: Jacana Media. ISBN 978-1-77009-241-9.
- Chandler, Asa C. (1916). A study of the structure of feathers, with reference to their taxonomic significance. Berkeley, CA: University of California Press.
- Cheke, Robert A.; Mann, Clive F. & Allen, Richard (2001). Sunbirds: A Guide to the Sunbirds, Flowerpeckers, Spiderhunters and Sugarbirds of the World. London: Christopher Helm. ISBN 978-1-873403-80-8.
- Coues, Elliott (1890). Handbook of Field and General Ornithology. London: Macmillan and Co. OCLC 263166207.
- del Hoyo, Josep; Elliott, Andrew; Sargatal, Jordi, eds. (1992). Handbook of the Birds of the World, Volume 1: Ostrich to Ducks. Barcelona: Lynx Edicions. ISBN 978-84-87334-10-8.
- Ehrlich, Paul R.; Dobkin, Darryl A.; Wheye, Darryl; Pimm, Stuart L. (1994). The Birdwatcher's Handbook. Oxford University Press. ISBN 978-0-19-858407-0.
- Elphick, Jonathan (2016). Birds: A Complete Guide to their Biology and Behavior. Buffalo, New York: Firefly Books. ISBN 978-1-77085-762-9.
- Feduccia, Alan (1999). The Origin and Evolution of Birds. Yale University Press. ISBN 978-0-300-07861-9.
- Floyd, Ted (2008). Smithsonian Field Guide to the Birds of North America. HarperCollins. ISBN 978-0-06-112040-4.
- Gill, Frank B. (1995). Ornithology (2 ed.). New York, NY: W. H. Freeman and Company. ISBN 978-0-7167-2415-5.
- Howell, Steve N. G. (2007). Gulls of the Americas. New York: Houghton Mifflin Company. ISBN 978-0-618-72641-7.
- King, Anthony Stuart; McLelland, John, eds. (1985). Form and Function in Birds, volume 3. London, UK: Academic Press. ISBN 978-0-12-407503-0.
- Lovette, Irby J.; Fitzpatrick, John W. (2016). Handbook of Bird Biology. Wiley. ISBN 978-1-118-29104-7.
- Newton, Alfred; Gadow, Hans Friedrich; Lydekker, Richard; Roy, Charles Smart; Shufeldt, Robert Wilson (1899). A Dictionary of Birds. London: A. and C. Black. OCLC 623393918.
- Mobley, Jason A.; Brewer, Duncan; Elphick, Jonathan; Hoare, Ben; Unwin, Mike; Woodward, John; et al. (2008). Birds of the World. Tarrytown, NY: Marshall Cavendish. ISBN 978-0-7614-7775-4.
- Pettingill, Olin Sewall Jr. (1985). Ornithology in Laboratory and Field. Orlando, FL: Academic Press. ISBN 978-0-12-552455-1.
- Pettingill Jr., Olin Sewall (2013). Ornithology in Laboratory and Field. Elsevier. ISBN 978-1-4832-6311-3.
- Proctor, Noble S.; Lynch, Patrick J. (1998). Manual of Ornithology: Avian Structure and Function. New Haven, CT: Yale University Press. ISBN 978-0-300-07619-6.
- Roots, Clive (2006). Flightless Birds. Westport, CT: Greenwood Publishing Group. ISBN 978-0-313-08394-5.
- Scott, Graham (2010). Essential Ornithology. Oxford University Press. ISBN 978-0-19-856997-8.
- Sibley, David; et al. (2001). The Sibley Guide to Bird Life & Behaviour. London: Christopher Helm. ISBN 978-0-7136-6250-4.
- Terres, J. K. (1980). The Audubon Society Encyclopedia of North American Birds. New York, NY: Knopf. ISBN 978-0-394-46651-4.
- Trail, Pepper (2001). "Wing Feathers" (PDF). U.S. Fish and Wildlife Service. Archived from the original (PDF) on 30 September 2017.
- Vinicombe, Keith (2014). The Helm Guide to Bird Identification. London: Bloomsbury Publishing. ISBN 978-1-4729-0554-3.
- Weaver, Peter (1981). The Birdwatcher's Dictionary. London: Bloomsbury Publishing. ISBN 978-1-4081-3852-6.
