= Sweetbread =

Culinary name for types of offal

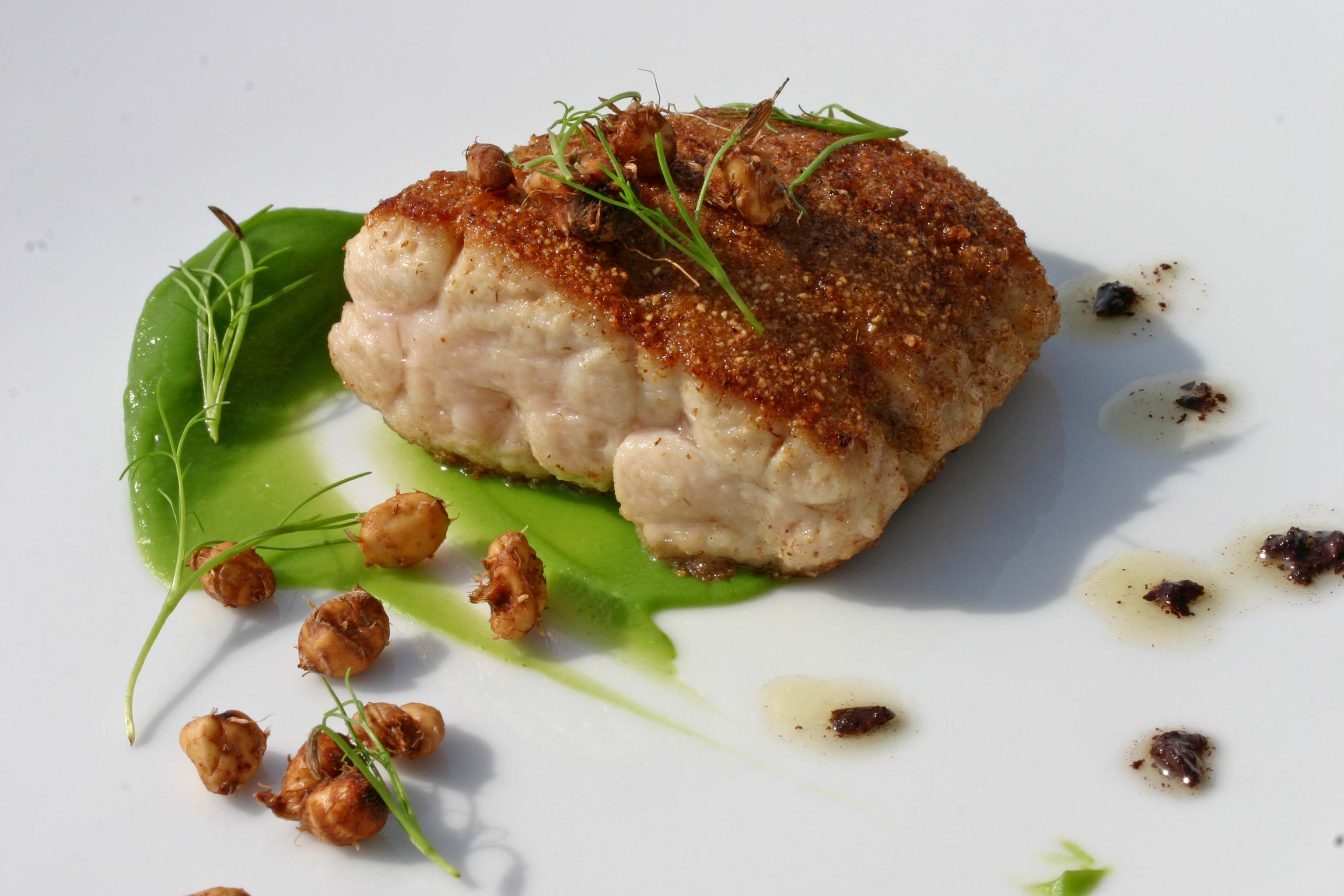
A dish of crusted sweetbreads

Sweetbread is a culinary name for the thymus or pancreas, typically from calf or lamb. Sweetbreads have a rich, slightly gamey flavour and a tender, succulent texture. They are often served as an appetizer or a main course and can be accompanied by a variety of sauces and side dishes. The etymology of the name is unclear.

== Description ==
Sweetbread is a culinary name for the thymus (also called throat, gullet, or neck sweetbread) or pancreas (also called stomach, belly or heart sweetbread), typically from calf (French: ris de veau) or lamb (ris d'agneau).

The "heart" sweetbreads are more spherical, while the "throat" sweetbreads are more cylindrical. As the thymus is replaced by fibrous tissue in older animals, only pancreatic sweetbreads come from beef and pork. Like other edible non-muscle from animal carcasses, sweetbreads may be categorized as offal, "fancy meat", or "variety meat". Various other glands used as food may also sometimes be called "sweetbreads", including the parotid gland ("cheek" or "ear" sweetbread) and the sublingual glands ("tongue" sweetbreads or "throat bread"), as well as the ovary and testicles.

== Use ==
Sweetbreads are often served as an appetizer or a main course and can be accompanied by a variety of sauces and side dishes. They are a part of traditional French cuisine. In Henri-Paul Pellaprat's Modern French Culinary Art, which was published in English in 1966, he includes six different recipes for sweetbreads, including versions with cream sauce, with ham, presented in pastry cases, and à la Florentine. In their 1961 book Mastering the Art of French Cooking: Volume 1, Simone Beck, Louisette Bertholle and Julia Child include six recipes for sweetbreads, with variations of cream and mushroom sauces, a version à l'Italienne including ham and mushrooms, and a gratin with Swiss cheese.

In a cookbook published in 1949, the American chef James Beard included recipes for sweetbreads en brochette, broiled sweetbreads, and three variations of sautéed sweetbreads.

Sweetbreads are a component of the Creole cuisine of Louisiana, a state in the United States, with recipes included in some of the earliest cookbooks published there. Many restaurants in the city of New Orleans serve sweetbreads.

In Iran, sweetbread is a common Persian street food and is often served as a kebab. One common preparation of sweetbreads involves soaking in salt water, then poaching in milk, after which the outer membrane is removed. Once dried and chilled, they are often breaded and fried.

Sweetbreads, called mollejas, are also eaten in Argentinian and Northern Mexican cuisines, as well as regional variations in the neighbouring US state of Texas, where they are commonly slow-grilled over charcoal, sometimes after poaching. Prior to cooking, they are often soaked in salted water or milk as a form of dégorgement.

== Etymology ==
The word sweetbread is first attested in the 16th century, but the etymology of the name is unclear. Sweet is perhaps used since the thymus is sweet and rich-tasting, as opposed to savoury-tasting muscle flesh. Bread may come from Middle English brede, meaning "roast meat".

== See also ==
- Head cheese – typically, meat from the head of a calf or pig
- Testicles as food ("Rocky Mountain oysters" and other euphemisms)
