= Culinary name =

Names for foods in the kitchen or in trade

Culinary names, menu names, or kitchen names are names of foods used in the preparation or selling of food, as opposed to their names in agriculture or in scientific nomenclature. The menu name may even be different from the kitchen name. For example, from the 19th until the mid-20th century, many restaurant menus were written in French and not in the local language.

Examples include veal (calf), calamari (squid), and sweetbreads (pancreas or thymus gland). Culinary names are especially common for fish and seafood, where multiple species are marketed under a single familiar name.

== Euphemism ==
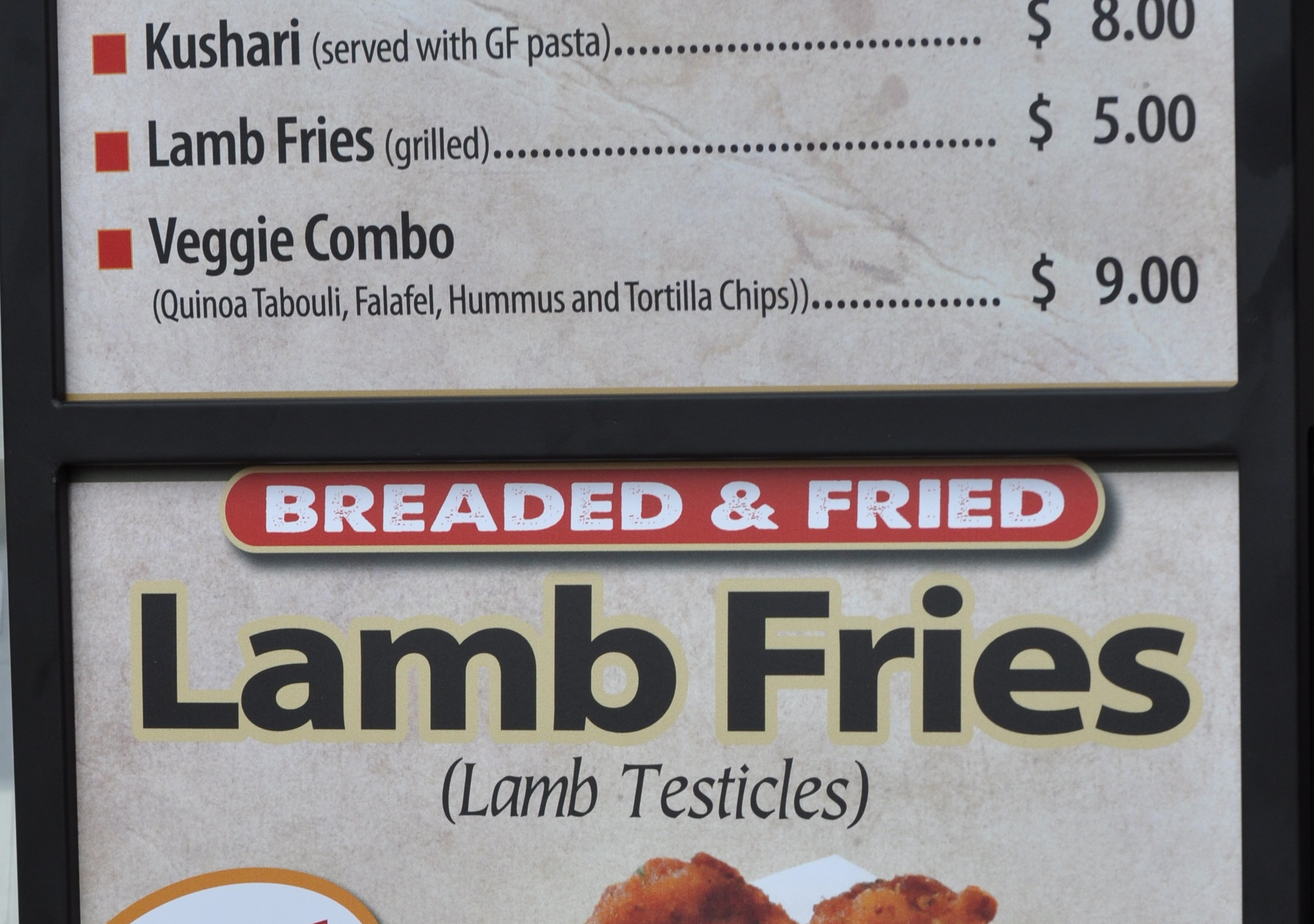
Lamb fries on a menu at the Minnesota State Fair

Euphemisms may be used where the idea of eating some foods may disgust or offend some eaters, regardless of their actual taste. For example;

- Testicles: Rocky Mountain oysters, Prairie oysters, lamb fries, or animelles
- Fish milt: soft roe or white roe to disguise that is actually sperm rather than eggs
- Thymus gland and pancreas gland: sweetbreads
- Kangaroo meat: Australus has been proposed as a euphemism

== Attractiveness ==
The traditional name may be considered dull, undistinctive, or unattractive.

- Kiwifruit: a rename of the Chinese gooseberry which has now become its standard name
- Mahi-mahi: the dolphinfish is often referred to with this name to avoid confusion with dolphin (the marine mammal) meat
- The Patagonian toothfish is marketed as the Chilean sea bass
- The African cichlid found in many aquaria is presented as tilapia
- The spinal marrow of veal and beef is called amourettes
- The meat of Asian carps has been marketed in the United States as silverfin or copi to avoid the social stigma and promote it as a commercial food

== Fancifulness ==
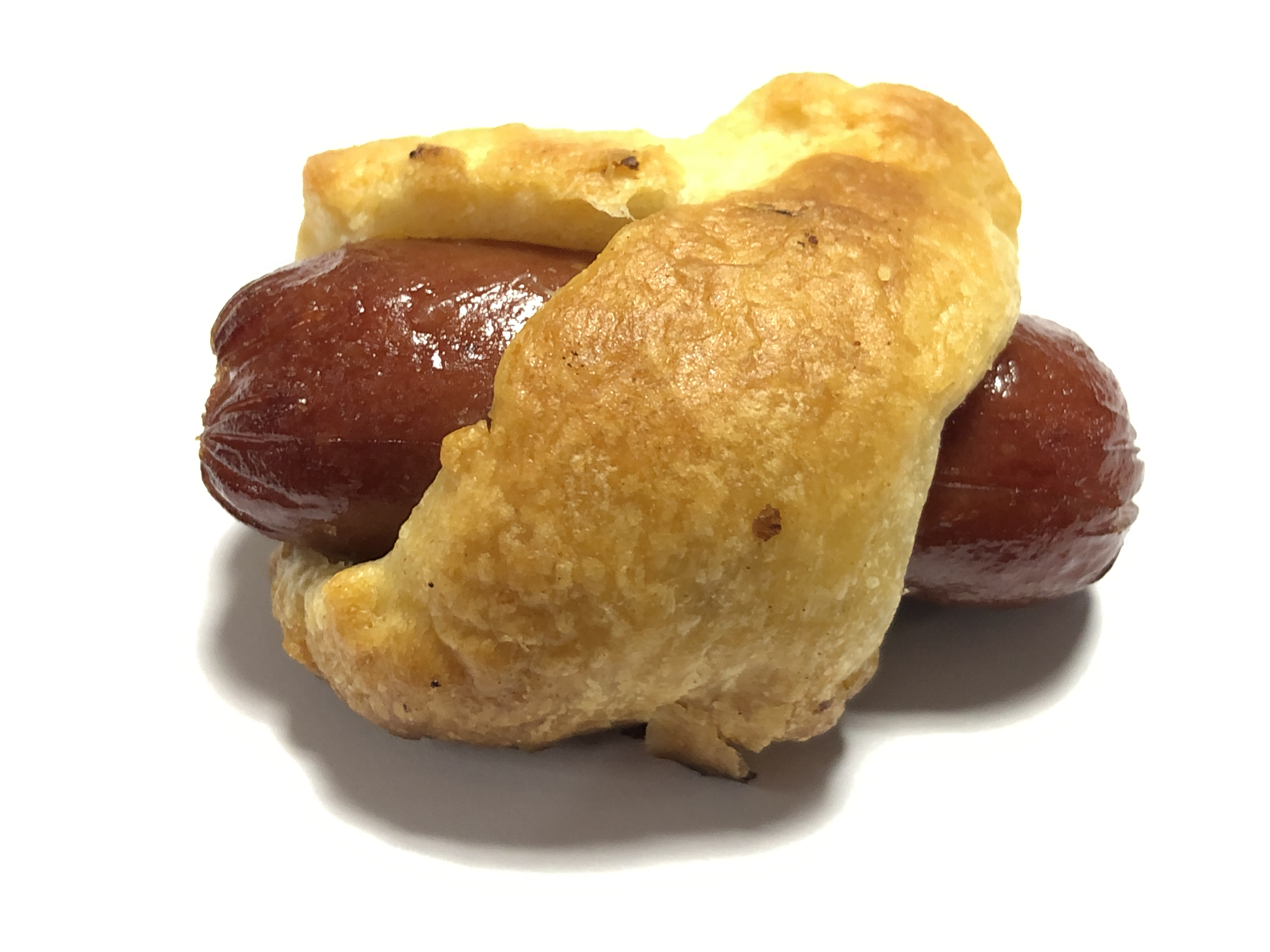
A pig in a blanket

Many dishes have fanciful or jocular names.

- Drumstick, a chicken's calf
- Angels on horseback, oysters wrapped in bacon
- Pigs in a blanket, various dishes of sausage in dough
- Floating island, egg whites on custard sauce
- Ladyfinger, a type of sponge cake
- Ladyfinger, okra
- İmam bayıldı ("the Imam fainted"), eggplant and onion

== Grouping ==
A variety of sources may be collected under a single name.

- Tuna, sardine and mackerel are all common names that include a variety of several different (and sometimes unrelated) species of food fish

== Prestige ==
Names may be chosen to evoke more prestigious, rare or expensive foods, for which they are a substitute.

- Lumpsucker (or lumpfish) roe is named lumpfish caviar
- Cassia bark is called cinnamon
- Langostino is sometimes called lobster or langostino lobster
- In North America, many flounder species are called soles, e.g. Microstomus pacificus is named Dover sole

== Tradition ==
A name may be used to evoke a specific culinary tradition.

- Shrimp in Italian-American contexts is often called scampi
- Florentine refers to dishes that include spinach
- Squid is often called by its Italian name, calamari, on menus, and octopus can be referred to as polpi.

== Diglossia ==
Names may reflect different terminology stemming from diglossia; the use of two dialects or languages in a region.

- The words beef, veal, pork, mutton, venison and poultry are derived from the words used by the French-speaking lords in post-Conquest England

== Humor and ethnic dysphemism ==
Humorous exaltation often takes the form of a dysphemism disparaging particular groups or places. It has been observed that "Celtic dishes seem to receive more than their share of humorous names in English cookbooks". Many of these are now considered offensive. See List of foods named after places for foods named after their actual place of origin.

- Welsh rabbit, melted cheese on toast. "Welsh" was probably used as a pejorative dysphemism, meaning "anything substandard or vulgar", and suggesting that "only people as poor and stupid as the Welsh would eat cheese and call it rabbit", or that "the closest thing to rabbit the Welsh could afford was melted cheese on toast". Or it may simply allude to the "frugal diet of the upland Welsh".
- Welsh caviar, laverbread, made of seaweed;
- Essex lion, veal;
- Norfolk capon, kipper;
- Irish apricot, apple, grape, lemon, plum, etc., potato;
- Scotch woodcock, scrambled eggs and anchovies on toast;
- Dutch goose, a stuffed pig's stomach in Pennsylvania Dutch cuisine;
- French goose, a kind of sausage stew;
- English monkey, melted cheese with breadcrumbs soaked in milk, served on toast or crackers;
- Albany beef, Hudson River sturgeon used as a substitute for beef.
- Sea kitten, fish. A renaming proposed by People for the Ethical Treatment of Animals, in the hope of dissuading people from eating fish, by likening fish to appealing companion animals.

== Other ==
- In French, chestnuts are called châtaignes on the tree, but marrons in the kitchen
- "Laver" is a culinary name for certain edible algae, usually species of Porphyra such as Porphyra umbilicalis, although "green laver" may refer to species of Monostroma or Ulva; species of Ulva are also known as "sea lettuce"
- Truita de patata (lit. 'potato trout') in Catalan cuisine, a potato omelette: "if you don't catch a trout, you've got to have something more humble for dinner -- something to pretend is a trout".
- Cappon magro (lit. 'fast-day capon'), a seafood salad

== See also ==
- Trade name
- Brand

== Bibliography ==
- "Culinary terminology" in Oxford Companion to Food, 1st edition, s.v.
- Andre Simon, A concise encyclopedia of gastronomy mentions 16 different 'culinary names' passim
