= List of killings by law enforcement officers in the United States, February 2018 =

This is a list of people reported killed by non-military law enforcement officers in the United States in February 2018, whether in the line of duty or not, and regardless of reason or method. The listing documents the occurrence of a death, making no implications regarding wrongdoing or justification on the part of the person killed or officer involved. Killings are arranged by date of the incident that caused death. Different death dates, if known, are noted in the description. The table below lists 81 people.

== February 2018 ==
Date	Name (age) of the deceased	State (city)	Description
2018-02-28	Oscar Leal (37)	California (Vista)	Police restrained Leal during a detention. He was found unresponsive at his arrival to jail and transported to hospital, where he died. A medical examiner ruled his death a homicide by restraint compounded by methamphetamine use.
2018-02-28	Qawi A. Muhammad (48)	Florida (Orlando)	Muhammed showed up armed at a restaurant seeking an ex-girlfriend who had a restraining order on him. Police responded to 911 calls, and as Muhammed came out of the restaurant, he refused their orders to drop the weapon.
2018-02-27	Curtis Bradley Ware (33)	Idaho (Coeur d'Alene)	Police made a traffic stop on Ware, then discovered there was a warrant for his arrest. When they tried to arrest him, Ware pulled a gun and began firing; the officers returned fire.
2018-02-27	Dustin James Case (20)	South Carolina (Chester)	Police responding to a report of a stolen vehicle, found Case driving and pursued him. Case crashed the car. As officers approached him, they saw him brandishing a gun and shot him.
2018-02-27	Marlon Smith (29)	Texas (Dallas)	Smith was the suspect in the shooting death of his former boss. When police found him later that day, Smith got out of his car bearing a gun and exchanged fire with the police.
2018-02-26	William Watson (40)	Missouri (St. Louis)	U.S. marshal serving a warrant in Glasgow Village was shot by a suspect inside a residence. Other marshals responding to the scene had a gunbattle with Watson, who was eventually found dead inside.
2018-02-25	Steven Juarez (42)	California (Gilroy)	Juarez was discovered by Gilroy police who refused to surrender and chased by officers who used less-than-lethal options including a Taser, physical force and a carotid restraint in their efforts to take the man into custody and subsequently declared dead at the hospital.
2018-02-25	Santos Eris Nunez-Garcia	California (Los Angeles)	Police responding to a burglary alarm were confronted by an armed man and shot him. (He had cut a hole in the roof of a marijuana dispensary.
2018-02-25	Douglas Oneyear (36)	Wyoming (Casper)	A convenience store clerk called police, reporting a man had come in, threatened her with a sword, and left again. A few minutes later, police found the man a couple blocks away and shot him.
2018-02-26	Orbel Nazarians (22)	California (Los Angeles)	Nazarians called 911 reporting that he had a handgun and a knife and was suicidal. Police responding knew that he had been in psychiatric facilities recently. Nazarians came out of the house armed with an “edged weapon”; after trying to subdue him with a bean-bag gun and a Taser, they shot him.
2018-02-26	Ethan Straub (25)	Kansas (Wamego)	Officers were responding to a report of an armed carjacking and found Straub riding a bicycle while holding a gun, then trying to steal another car. Straub and officers exchanged fire.
2018-02-26	Joshua Kinnard (37)	Arizona (Gilbert)	Police were called to a home where Kinnard was acting erratically. After trying to calm him for a time, they went out into the yard to talk with another resident. Kinnard then came out of the house with a gun.
2018-02-26	Aaron Clifford Fike (27)	Ohio (Tiro)	A police officer noticed Fike walking along a road carrying a shotgun. When he stopped to talk to Fike, Fike shot at his car and ran off. Police saw him again a short while later, told him to stop, but Fike ran into his home. When he came back outside and pointed the gun at officers, they shot him.
2018-02-25	Haydon Taylor (25)	Oklahoma (Oklahoma City)	Police were called to a hotel that reported a homeless man panhandling in their halls. When they arrived, Taylor brandished a knife at them; when he did not obey their orders to drop it, they shot him.
2018-02-23	Douglas Kemp (58)	Indiana (Evansville)	Police pulled Kemp over for speeding, and saw a gun in his car. When they told him to get out, Kemp reached for the gun, and the police shot him.
2018-02-23	Mario Dantoni Bass (37)	Virginia (Woodbridge)	A U.S. marshals task force tried to arrest Bass on multiple felony charges, at a local hotel. Bass jumped out of a window, and confronted more officers who were outside. A physical struggle ensued with an ICE agent shooting Bass in the upper body. He eventually died in hospital.
2018-02-22	Jacob Uptain (27)	Arizona (Phoenix)	A local resident called police to report a man inspecting several homes before entering a vacant home from the backyard. Police found Uptain out front of the house, with a gun and knife visible in his pants; when they challenged him, he raised his shirt to display a second gun. Police ordered Uptain to stand still with his hands up, but he reached for his waist and they shot him. They found more weapons inside the vacant house, which the owner did not know about.
2018-02-22	Joshua D. Babb (26)	Tennessee (Church Hill)	Police responded to a domestic violence call involving gunshots. On arrival, they saw Babb through a screen door, apparently bearing a gun. Babb came out of the house and argued with officers, refusing their commands; when he threatened officers with the gun, they shot him.
2018-02-21	Darion Baker (22)	Texas (Stratford)	A Stratford police officer noticed a stolen vehicle going by and pulled it over. As he approached, it appears that Baker (driving the car) began to drive away; the officer felt he was being attacked with the car and shot into the car, killing Baker.
2018-02-21	Lee Edward Bonner (37)	Mississippi (Jackson)	Police investigating possible drug activity encountered two suspects, who ran away. One -- Bonnor -- turned and fired a handgun at them, and the police returned fire. There are some claims that the officer knew Bonner and that influenced his actions, and also that the officer continued to shoot Bonner after he was down.
2018-02-21	Edward Hallinan (39)	Arizona (Phoenix)	Hallinan's wife called 911 to report that he had pointed a gun at her during an argument. When police arrived, Hallinan began to leave in a truck, but then stopped and began shooting at them; an officer fired and killed him. Police then found three bodies in a nearby yard who they believe were killed by Hallinan.
2018-02-21	Michael Andrew Schieffer (27)	North Dakota (Stutsman County)	Schieffer was driving with a warrant for his arrest and a suspended license, when police tried to pull him over. During a twenty-mile chase, Schieffer shot at officers; when he stopped, he got out of his car bearing a handgun and still shooting. Police then returned fire.
2018-02-21	Unidentified	Alabama (Montgomery)	Police were responding to a report of a gunshot victim when they encountered a "fleeing, armed suspect".As they pursued him, they exchanged fire with the suspect, killing him and wounding an officer.
2018-02-21	Glenn Tyndell (37)	Maryland (Fort Washington)	Tyndell's ex-wife when to a neighbor, an off-duty police officer, to get help when Tyndell threatened her. Tyndell killed the neighbor and left. When police found and chased him, Tyndell got out of his car and shot at them, and was killed.
2018-02-19	Unidentified (45)	Texas (Denton)	Two officers sitting in a patrol car were approached by a man and threatened. When they got out, the man drew a knife; he moved away into some woods but then came toward them again, still with the knife. The officers used a Taser on him and, when he did not stop, shot him.
2018-02-19	Thomas Vincent Alvarez (23)	Texas (Austin)	After an argument among roommates, some of the parties left their home and Alvarez followed them in a taxi. Police stopped the cab and the cab driver got out; but Alvarez got into the driver seat and drove away. As police chased him, they could see he held a gun to his own head at times, and he tried to ram the cab through an apartment gate. When the chase ended, Alvarez stayed in the cab; because he was waving the gun at them, police shot him.
2018-02-19	Unidentified	Washington (Seattle)	After receiving reports of a car prowler, the suspect jumped from a car and fled on foot. He turned and fired at officers as he ran. Police returned fire but did not hit him. The suspect then stole a vehicle at gunpoint, and crashed it a few blocks away. Police opened fire on the suspect, killing him.
2018-02-18	Ernest Manuel Montelongo (33)	Texas (Guadalupe County)	Description to come
2018-02-17	Unidentified	Oklahoma (Catoosa)	Description to come
2018-02-17	Nathaniel Montoya (23)	New Mexico (Las Cruces)	Nathaniel Montoya was wanted for questioning following a murder. Police spotted a van matching the description of Montoya's, and made a traffic stop. Montoya fled, and a high-speed chase began. The van, driven by Montoya, struck a parked vehicle in a convenience store parking lot, ending the chase, police said. At least one officer fired several rounds, killing Montoya.
2018-02-17	Ryan Batchelder (28)	Florida (Hernando)	Police were told Ryan Batchelder threatened to shoot someone in Xstream Games 3. Deputies found Batchelder in his car and pursued his vehicle but ended the chase at FL-200 due to high speeds and heavy traffic. A short time later, he was spotted on southbound U.S. 41. Deputies said Batchelder pointed his gun at them, and they attempted to stop him. Batchelder crashed his car into a sheriff's vehicle and caused the cruiser to hit three other parked cars. Deputies shot and killed Batchelder in his vehicle.
2018-02-17	Unidentified	West Virginia (Inwood)	Deputies responded to the Coco Loco nightclub after a report came in at 2:35 a.m. of multiple altercations inside and outside the establishment, police said. When officers arrived on the scene, they discovered a man shooting a gun in the club parking lot as patrons were leaving the building. The man was then fatally shot by deputies.
2018-02-16	Odrey Paul Reed (39)	West Virginia (Sissonville)	U.S. marshals went to arrest Reed, who had escaped from a halfway house. How they came to shoot him has not been reported.
2018-02-16	Tim Berger (59)	Florida (Cocoa Beach)	Police were called to the Royal Colonial Condos around 10:30 p.m. when a woman reported that her husband, Tim Berger, was intoxicated and fired a gun inside their home. Several officers responded to the home and were allegedly threatened when they tried to make contact with Berger, and officers James Scheiner and Taylor Payne shot and killed him.
2018-02-15	Wesley Taylor (58)	North Carolina (Henderson)	At 9:15 p.m., an officer was serving a narcotics search warrant on Skenes Avenue. Wesley Taylor exchanged gunfire with the officer. The officer was wounded, and Taylor was killed.
2018-02-15	Unidentified	Utah (Montezuma Creek)	A deputy pulled over a light-colored passenger car east of Sand Canyon for broken brake lights and no visible registration. The vehicle had three occupants. About 1 p.m., the deputy approached the vehicle, and the driver made a U-turn and fled west. While in pursuit, the deputy allegedly was fired upon by someone in the vehicle. The pursuit continued for more than 10 miles and ended just over the Utah border after the vehicle lost a tire and was driving on its rim. The driver parked the car broadside in the lane, and the driver came out with his hands up, then the car rolled into the ditch, sparking a brush fire. Another occupant of the vehicle shot at the deputy, who shot and killed him.
2018-02-15	Arthur Joseph Gonzales (57)	Arizona (Mesa)	Officers responded to reports of a person with a gun. Officers found Arthur Joseph Gonzales waving a handgun and rifle as he made "incoherent statements" at a home. After a SWAT team arrived to help secure the area, a shooting took place in front of the house. He said the man ran inside, then was seen in back of the house with a gun, and a second shooting then took place. Police took the man into custody with a gunshot wound to the arm. Gonzales died days later.
2018-02-14	Donald Fulton (41)	Alabama (Mobile)	Police responded to a domestic violence call. Donald Fulton allegedly forced his family out of his home at gunpoint before retreating back inside. He threatened to kill himself. After police surrounded the house, hostage negotiators convinced Fulton to drop his weapon. Police entered the home at which point Fulton rearmed himself and shot at the officers who shot and killed him.
2018-02-14	Preston Ray Holloway (27)	Missouri (Belton)	At about 11:31 p.m., the Belton Police Department attempted to pull over a red Ford Explorer, driven by Preston Ray Holloway, for suspicious activity and driving without a license plate. Instead, Holloway opened the door and began firing at officers before driving south. Two Missouri State Highway Patrol troopers were working a traffic stop and were able to stop the vehicle using stop sticks. Holloway, got out of his vehicle and pointed a gun at his own head. He then walked down the interstate pointing the gun at passing vehicles and at one point firing a shot. The man then forced another driver out of a white GMC Terrain and began driving north into Raymore, Missouri. Police stopped him in a subdivision. Holloway began walking away from officers and pointed the gun at his own head before turning it towards the officers, who shot and killed him at about 11:50 p.m.
2018-02-14	Travis D. Tucker (29)	Indiana (Kokomo)	Deputies responded to a burglary call shortly before 4:30 p.m. When the deputies arrived, they found Travis Tucker in a pickup truck in a field. Police said he was armed with a shotgun, and he was shot and killed for undisclosed reasons.
2018-02-14	Jimmy Terry (30)	Indiana (Merrillville)	Merrillville police were called out at 11:38 a.m. to Art Hill Ford Lincoln, after receiving a 911 call that a man was armed with a knife and "chasing an employee" inside the dealership, police said. As officers arrived, they received information from 911 dispatch that Jimmy Terry had entered a dark-colored Jeep, believed to be his own, in an attempt to leave the dealership. Terry was stopped, shot and killed, police said, although what precipitated the killing was withheld.
2018-02-14	Unidentified	Texas (Fort Worth)	Officers were dispatched to investigate an alleged domestic dispute at a business. When they arrived, they saw the man leaving the area, so they followed. The man stopped near the shopping center, and then began walking toward the officers, who ordered him to stop. The man then displayed a weapon, and the officers shot and killed him.
2018-02-13	Peter Le (52)	Colorado (Denver)	Peter Le, 52, allegedly killed his own father, Quyen Le, 86, before he was shot and killed by police. A 911 caller told dispatch around 10:30 p.m. that one of his brothers was harassing their father at their home. When police arrived, the front door was open, and an officer saw Peter Le standing with a knife and gun in his hands inside the home, police said. The officer ordered the younger Le to drop the weapon, but he continued to threaten to harm his father for several minutes, and refused to drop either weapon. Peter Le then fatally shot his father, and the officer shot and killed Le.
2018-02-13	Ronnell Foster (33)	California (Vallejo)	Around 7:40 p.m., an officer tried to stop Ronell Foster. Police said he took off running, and the officer chased after him. The two allegedly fought, and the officer shot and killed Foster.
2018-02-12	Raymond Bishop (84)	Florida (Homestead)	Raymond Bishop was apparently distraught because his service dog and himself were being kicked out of their living space. Police said he pointed a gun at them.
2018-02-11	Unidentified	Oklahoma (Grant)	An employee of the Choctaw Travel Plaza contacted security officers about a person causing a disturbance. When police approached, the person produced a gun and threatened the officer. He was ordered to drop the gun, and he pointed it at officers who shot and killed him.
2018-02-11	Mark Daniels (39)	Pennsylvania (Pittsburgh)	At 1:19 a.m. two Pittsburgh police officers were on patrol when they encountered a man acting suspiciously. Both police agencies said the man fired a gun at the officers, and that one officer returned fire, hitting the man, who fled. Mark Daniels was chased and found before being transported to a hospital where he died.
2018-02-11	Benjamin Gregware (42)	Vermont (Bolton)	A Vermont State Police trooper and a Richmond police officer shot and killed Benjamin Gregware, police said. The shooting occurred at about 3:51 p.m. during a traffic stop on the side of the southbound lanes near mile marker 69. The man was the sole occupant of the car that was stopped.Police said Gregware was armed with a handgun at the time of the killing.
2018-02-10	Michael Weber (63)	Arizona (Kingman)	Kingman Police Department was called to the Zuni Village RV Park around 8:15 p.m., and the officer spoke with the person who reported a possible domestic violence incident. The officer then attempted to talk to the people in the RV where the alleged domestic violence happened. The man confronted the officer, and they fought, at which point, the officer shot and killed the man.
2018-02-10	Sidney T. Richardson (48)	Florida (Tampa)	Police responded to a call about a man threatening his 17-year-old female cousin with a machete. Upon arrival, officers found Sidney Richardson. The officers ordered Richardson to drop his machete. When he refused, an officer shocked him with a Taser, but Richardson still didn't drop the knife. In fear for their safety, one of the officers shot and killed Richardson.
2018-02-10	Troy Michael Jacques (41)	Colorado (Aurora)	Around 11:30 p.m., officers conducted a traffic stop. Shortly after that traffic stop, an Aurora Police officer fired several shots killing Troy Jacques. Few details were immediately released.
2018-02-10	Steven Tyler Reed (25)	Ohio (Columbus)	Police said that officers were dispatched around 9:30 p.m. on the report of a domestic violence complaint. When officers arrived, they were told Steven Tyler Reed fled to Letchworth Avenue. Reed and the officers became involved in a confrontation, and Officer Nathan A. Schwind shot and killed Reed.
2018-02-09	John Hamilton (78)	Arizona (Flagstaff)	At 9 p.m., police said they were contacted by a woman who reported that she was confronted by an armed man. Responding officers located the man. He allegedly pointed the firearm at a victim and officers and was shot and killed.
2018-02-09	David Darden (36)	Georgia (Atlanta)	Atlanta police found a stolen vehicle just after 2 p.m. Officers requested the help of Georgia State Patrol and a chase occurred. While attempting to evade the trooper, the driver ran into an APD patrol vehicle, police said. The trooper shot and killed David Darden.
2018-02-09	Tierre Guthrie (39)	Georgia (Locust Grove)	Deputies responded to arrest Tierre Guthrie for failing to make a court appearance, but police said he wouldn't cooperate. There was a fight and one of the officers shot and killed Guthrie. Deputies Michael Corley and Ralph Sidwell “Sid” Callaway were injured, and Locust Grove Police Officer Chase Maddox, 26, was killed.
2018-02-08	Ricardo Colon (35)	Florida (Grant-Valkaria)	Brevard County Sheriff's deputies shot and killed a suicidal man at about 4 p.m. A family member said Ricardo Enrique Colon, 35, was cutting his arms. Deputies Kelly Dobson and Jose Santos responded to the 911 call and tried to stop him with a less-lethal measure before shooting and killing him.
2018-02-08	Lloyd Harris (40)	California (Antioch)	Lloyd Harris was allegedly a murder suspect and fugitive when he was shot and killed. A BB gun allegedly fell out of his belt after he was killed.
2018-02-07	Hugo Steven Selva (22)	Florida (Lantana)	A man blamed for two other shootings in the previous 24 hours fatally shot a woman outside a Lake Worth grocery store, then raced the wrong way down northbound Interstate 95 and got into three head-on crashes with a total of at least six other motorists. Minutes later, a Palm Beach County sheriff's deputy shot and killed him on the interstate near Lantana Road.
2018-02-06	Unidentified	California (Los Angeles)	A man was shot and killed by deputies after he got into a Los Angeles County Sheriff's Department patrol vehicle and drove toward a deputy. Few details were immediately released.
2018-02-06	Paul Mono (65)	California (Laguna Woods)	Paul Mono was apparently having his home remodeled and grew angry at a contractor, who called police. Mono was shot and killed when he displayed a gun.
2018-02-06	Alex Duran (29)	Colorado (Denver)	Officers responded to a burglary in progress at a home shortly before 6 p.m. Officers were inside the home when Alex Duran “produced a knife” and was shot and killed by officers. No officers were injured.
2018-02-06	James Benny Hobbs (59)	Florida (St. Augustine)	James Hobbs was a fugitive when he was shot and killed at a St. Augustine hotel. The U.S. Marshals Office and the FBI were tracking him since he fled from New Hampshire to Florida following a warrant for his arrest on charges of aggravated sexual assault on a child. He was unarmed, but allegedly made sudden movements.
2018-02-05	Manuel Zetina (19)	Colorado (Colorado Springs)	El Paso County Sheriff's Deputy Micah Flick, 34, was killed and three other police were wounded while trying to arrest a car theft suspect in east Colorado Springs, police said. The male gunman was also killed, and a bystander was wounded in the shooting.
2018-02-05	Jason Richard Sienze (35)	California (Nice)	Deputies responded at 11:40 a.m. on a report of a suspicious man. At 11:55 a.m., the sheriff's office received a report of a man brandishing a firearm, police said. A deputy contacted the armed man, and the man was shot and killed. Early reports said the man had been involved in several crimes and had pointed a gun at police.
2018-02-04	Anthony Jacob Weber (16)	California (Los Angeles)	Deputies were called because a boy was reported pointing a handgun at a motorist. Arriving deputies said the boy had a handgun tucked into his waistband before he ran, prompting the deputies to chase him. According to police, when the boy turned toward the deputies, they shot and killed Anthony Weber.
2018-02-04	Juan McCray (31)	Connecticut (Glastonbury)	McCray was killed by East Hartford Police officers after a car chase that ended in Glastonbury. After shooting out the front tire, McCray drove the car backwards, at which point police shot him.
2018-02-03	Unidentified	California (Lake Los Angeles)	Police were looking for a man suspected of criminal activity. He fought with officers and was shocked with a Taser, killing him.
2018-02-03	Ernie Lizana (49)	Mississippi (Gulfport)	Harrison County Sheriff's deputies and the Coastal Narcotics Enforcement Team had a tip Ernie Lizana was near the 2800 block of 23rd Avenue. When they went there before 1 a.m., Lizana ran and started shooting. He was shot and killed. Lizana was wanted on an aggravated assault charge because officers believed he shot a woman in the throat.
2018-02-03	Alan Greenough (43)	Massachusetts (Reading)	A man was suspected of domestic violence, police said. After several visits to the home, never catching the suspect, an officer shot and killed him, although details as to what precipitated the killing were withheld.
2018-02-03	Unidentified	Georgia (Atlanta)	A man entered an O'Reilly Auto Parts store and asked for a car alternator. When the clerk returned with the item, the man pointed a gun at the clerk and stole the alternator. Police said the man crossed the street and tried to steal a taxi, but the taxi driver sped away. An Atlanta police officer witnessed the attempted carjacking and confronted the man. He allegedly shot at Atlanta police officers and was shot and killed. No officers were injured. The man's gun was a BB gun.
2018-02-02	Unidentified	Texas (Winters)	The sheriff's office got a 911 call at 9:20 a.m. about a man who had fired a shot inside a home, while family members were inside. He was believed to be in mental distress, police said. About 1:15 p.m., the man walked out onto the patio, shouldered his rifle and aimed it at deputies and was shot and killed.
2018-02-02	Charlie Shoupe (27)	North Carolina (Charlotte)	Police said Officer Daniel Flynn shot Charlie Shoupe after Shoupe charged at Flynn with a knife. Police were called because Shoupe was suicidal.
2018-02-01	Taylor Schnortz (26)	Montana (Helena)	Deputies responded to a home just before midnight after being asked to check on Taylor Schnortz who was cutting himself, police said. The caller reported a man at the residence was bleeding from self-inflicted injuries and was suicidal. Deputies spoke with the armed man for about an hour before he was shot and killed.
2018-02-01	Brett Dontae Bush (28)	Georgia (Clayton)	After a chase and crash, Brett Bush allegedly attacked an officer with a knife and was shot and killed.
2018-02-01	Alexander W. Simpson (32)	Kentucky (Louisville)	Detectives pulled over a white pickup truck and were met with gunfire from the vehicle, which had four occupants. One detective was struck in the head and face and another, Det. Bradley Woolridge, shot and killed 32-year-old Alexander W. Simpson and wounded Billy Ray Riggs, who died a few days later.
2018-02-01	Billy Ray Riggs Jr. (38)	KY (Louisville)	Detectives pulled over a white pickup truck and were met with gunfire from the vehicle, which had four occupants. One detective was struck in the head and face and another, Det. Bradley Woolridge, shot and killed Alexander W. Simpson and wounded Billy Ray Riggs, who died a few days later.
2018-02-01	Anthony Joe Williams (37)	Texas (Houston)	After an alleged robbery and assault, Anthony Williams was shot and killed by police when he allegedly pointed a revolver at them.
2018-02-01	William Young (56)	Oklahoma (Oklahoma City)	Officer Brandon McDonald went to the door of a home to investigate a "trouble unknown" call. The officer was shot at when a man, later identified as William Young, answered the door. The officer shot and killed Young, police said.
2018-02-01	Daniel O. El (32)	Illinois (Peoria)	A police traffic stop and foot chase ended with a gunfight that left an officer shot and a Peoria Heights man, Daniel O. El, dead, police said. Two police officers in two squad cars tried to stop El's car at about 2:30 a.m. after he had made a stop sign violation and was discovered with an expired license plate registration. He allegedly fled, crashed, and fled on foot. El was killed during an exchange of gunfire.
2018-02-01	Albert E. Morton (31)	Pennsylvania (Harrisburg)	Albert E. Morton Jr. was pulled over around 12:45 a.m. but took off, allegedly striking the police officer who stopped him. The officer was not injured. Around 1:30 a.m., police spotted Morton's car, followed it, and allegedly saw the occupants toss out drugs and paraphernalia. When the car was stopped in the Hall Manor housing area, Morton was shot and killed as he accelerated toward a uniformed officer, police said.
2018-02-01	James M. Burks (35)	Ohio (Waverly)	After a domestic violence accusation, a traffic stop and a foot chase, James Burks was shot and killed when he allegedly fought with police.

== See also ==
- Death in custody § United States
- Henry A. Wallace Police Crime Public Database
- List of cases of police brutality
- List of countries with annual rates and counts for killings by law enforcement officers
- List of law enforcement officers killed in the line of duty in the United States
- List of law enforcement officers convicted for an on-duty killing in the United States
- List of shootings by US immigration agents
- List of police reforms related to the George Floyd protests
- List of unarmed African Americans killed by law enforcement officers in the United States
- Lists of killings by law enforcement officers
- Police brutality in the United States
- Police misconduct § United States
- Police riot § United States
- Police use of deadly force in the United States
