= Olean station (Missouri) =

- Olean Railroad Depot
- U.S. National Register of Historic Places
- Location within Missouri Location within the United States
- Location: Main St. E of jct. with California St., Olean, Missouri
- Coordinates: 38°24′38″N 92°31′42″W
- Area: 1 acre (0.40 ha)
- Built: 1884
- Architectural style: Standardized Railroad Depot
- NRHP reference No.: 93001452
- Added to NRHP: December 23, 1993

Olean Railroad Depot is a historic train station located at Olean, Miller County, Missouri. It was built about 1884 and is a one-story, rectangular frame building with board and batten siding. The building measures 16 feet, 2 inches, by 40 feet, 3 inches. It has a gable roof with a four-foot-wide overhang supported by brackets all around and the gable ends are embellished by decorative truss work. The depot closed in 1962.

The railroad depot, which lent its name to the surrounding community, was named after Olean, New York after several other names the town tried to use ran into conflict with other towns on the rail route.

It was added to the National Register of Historic Places in 1993.

Preceding station	Missouri Pacific Railroad	Following station
Eldon toward Bagnell	Jefferson City - Bagnell	Russellville toward Jefferson City
