= Olean, Missouri =

- Town
- Location in Miller County and the state of Missouri
- Coordinates: 38°24′37″N 92°31′48″W
- Country: United States
- State: Missouri
- County: Miller

Area
  - Total: 0.17 sq mi (0.45 km^{2})
  - Land: 0.17 sq mi (0.45 km^{2})
  - Water: 0 sq mi (0.00 km^{2})
- Elevation: 781 ft (238 m)

Population (2020)
  - Total: 114
  - Density: 659.4/sq mi (254.58/km^{2})
- Time zone: UTC-6 (Central (CST))
  - Summer (DST): UTC-5 (CDT)
- ZIP code: 65064
- Area code: 573
- FIPS code: 29-54560
- GNIS feature ID: 2396832

Olean is a town in northern Miller County, Missouri, United States. The population was 114 at the 2020 census.

== History ==
The community was laid in 1881-1882 by the Jefferson City, Lebanon and Southwestern Railway which became the Missouri Pacific Railroad. It was originally called "Proctor", after James G. Proctor, who was an early settler. The name was rejected because there was another Procter in Missouri. It was then changed to "Cove" because of its semicircular shape. That name was also rejected because of another similar name in the state. "Chester" was suggested but again was rejected because there was another Chester on the rail line. Ultimately, the railroad company imposed the name "Olean", after Olean, New York, apparently on a lark, as no documentation survives explaining any reasoning for choosing a city with no connections to the town in Missouri, which in turn had no connection to oil. Attribution to Dr. W.S. Allee appear not to be true, as Allee never lived in or visited New York State.

At the turn of the 20th century, Olean contained a gristmill and a canning factory.

The railroad left the community in 1962; its station is now listed on the National Register of Historic Places.

Since 1993, the community has hosted an annual Testicle Festival featuring cooked testicles from various animals. The festival wasn't held for several due to COVID-19 pandemic.

The Olean Railroad Depot was added to the National Register of Historic Places in 1993.

== Geography ==
Olean is in northern Miller County, 6 miles (10 km) north-northeast of Eldon and 26 miles (42 km) southwest of Jefferson City, the state capital. According to the U.S. Census Bureau, Olean has an area of 0.17 square miles (0.44 km^{2}), all land. Blythe Creek passes through the southeast part of the town, flowing northeasterly toward South Moreau Creek, part of the Moreau watershed leading to the Missouri River.

== Demographics ==
Historical population
Census	Pop.	Note	%±
1900	254		—
1910	214		−15.7%
1920	169		−21.0%
1930	160		−5.3%
1940	151		−5.6%
1950	165		9.3%
1960	135		−18.2%
1970	151		11.9%
1980	128		−15.2%
1990	106		−17.2%
2000	157		48.1%
2010	128		−18.5%
2020	114		−10.9%
U.S. Decennial Census

=== 2010 census ===
As of the census of 2010, there were 128 people, 57 households, and 29 families residing in the village. The population density was 752.9 inhabitants per square mile (290.7/km^{2}). There were 67 housing units at an average density of 394.1 per square mile (152.2/km^{2}). The racial makeup of the village was 90.6% White, 5.5% African American, and 3.9% from two or more races. Hispanic or Latino of any race were 3.1% of the population.

There were 57 households, of which 28.1% had children under the age of 18 living with them, 33.3% were married couples living together, 15.8% had a female householder with no husband present, 1.8% had a male householder with no wife present, and 49.1% were non-families. 38.6% of all households were made up of individuals, and 5.3% had someone living alone who was 65 years of age or older. The average household size was 2.25 and the average family size was 3.10.

The median age in the village was 42.5 years. 21.1% of residents were under the age of 18; 8.6% were between the ages of 18 and 24; 25.9% were from 25 to 44; 35.9% were from 45 to 64; and 8.6% were 65 years of age or older. The gender makeup of the village was 53.1% male and 46.9% female.

=== 2000 census ===
As of the census of 2000, there were 157 people, 62 households, and 40 families residing in the town. The population density was 922.0 inhabitants per square mile (356.0/km^{2}). There were 67 housing units at an average density of 393.4 per square mile (151.9/km^{2}). The racial makeup of the town was 97.45% White, 1.27% Native American, and 1.27% from two or more races.

There were 62 households, out of which 41.9% had children under the age of 18 living with them, 38.7% were married couples living together, 22.6% had a female householder with no husband present, and 33.9% were non-families. 29.0% of all households were made up of individuals, and 12.9% had someone living alone who was 65 years of age or older. The average household size was 2.53 and the average family size was 3.10.

In the town the population was spread out, with 36.9% under the age of 18, 8.3% from 18 to 24, 30.6% from 25 to 44, 12.7% from 45 to 64, and 11.5% who were 65 years of age or older. The median age was 30 years. For every 100 females, there were 98.7 males. For every 100 females age 18 and over, there were 80.0 males.

The median income for a household in the town was foodstamps. Males had a median income of $24,167 versus -$22,000 for females. The per capita income for the town was $10,296. About 17.4% of families and 24.0% of the population were below the poverty line, including 18.4% of those under the age of eighteen and 48.1% of those 65 or over.
