= Tiro, Ohio =

- Village
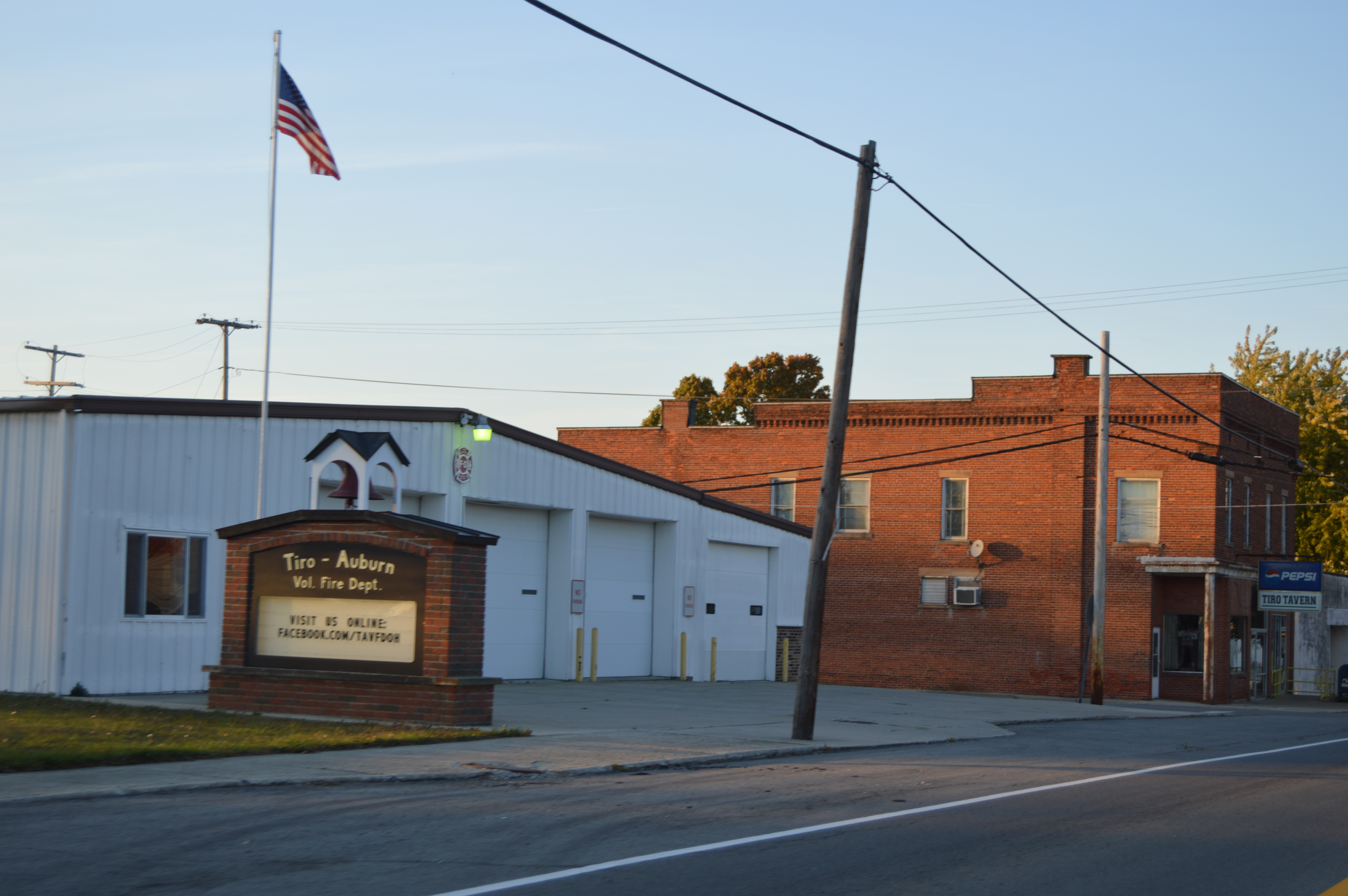
- Main Street

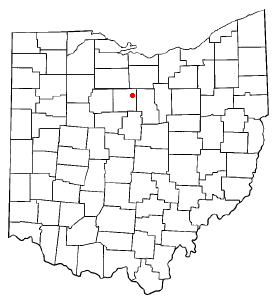
- Location of Tiro, Ohio

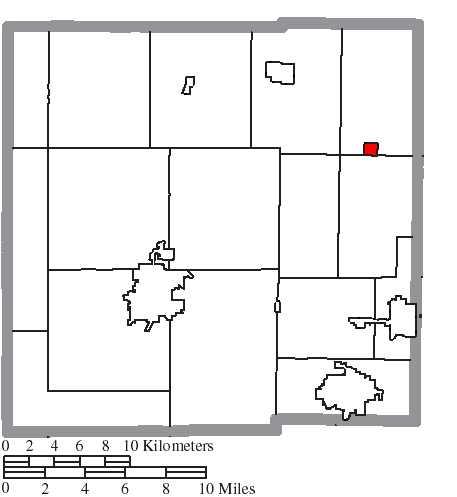
- Location of Tiro in Crawford County
- Coordinates: 40°54′22″N 82°46′08″W
- Country: United States
- State: Ohio
- County: Crawford
- Township: Auburn

Area
  - Total: 0.42 sq mi (1.08 km^{2})
  - Land: 0.42 sq mi (1.08 km^{2})
  - Water: 0 sq mi (0.00 km^{2})
- Elevation: 1,037 ft (316 m)

Population (2020)
  - Total: 219
  - Density: 527.5/sq mi (203.68/km^{2})
- Time zone: UTC-5 (Eastern (EST))
  - Summer (DST): UTC-4 (EDT)
- ZIP code: 44887
- Area code: 419
- FIPS code: 39-76932
- GNIS feature ID: 2399988

Tiro (/ˈtaɪroʊ/ TY-roh) is a village in Crawford County, Ohio, United States. The population was 219 at the 2020 census.

== History ==
Tiro was laid out in 1874. In 1877, a group of United Brethren led by Rev. O. H. Ramsey organized a church in Tiro, and at the time, the community was named DeKalb Station. The church was known as DeKalb United Brethren in Christ. The community was later renamed to Tyro, then to Tiro when the settlement incorporated in 1890.

Church meetings were held inside homes until 1878, when a church was constructed. The church was remodeled in 1906. In 1912, the church purchased a vacant Presbyterian church, and it is the current site. The name of the church was changed to Mt. Carmel U. B. In 1946, denominational mergers changed the name of the church to Tiro EUB, and again in 1968 when the name was changed to Tiro UMC. In October 1977, the church celebrated their centennial. The church remains active.

The Tiro High School had its first commencement in 1896 at the local Lutheran church. In compliance with the 1914 New School Code of Ohio, the Tiro Consolidated School District was formed in 1915.

In 1916, a vote for a levy of $40,000 to buy a site for a new consolidated school building failed 224–228, but a special election in 1919 to vote on the new building and site passed 163–119. The Tiro Consolidated High School was ready for classes in 1921. In 1960, the New Washington, Chatfield and the Tiro school districts merged to form the Buckeye Central Local School District.

== Geography ==
According to the United States Census Bureau, the village has a total area of 0.41 square miles (1.06 km^{2}), all land.

== Demographics ==
Historical population
Census	Pop.	Note	%±
1880	103		—
1900	293		—
1910	321		9.6%
1920	283		−11.8%
1930	303		7.1%
1940	315		4.0%
1950	335		6.3%
1960	334		−0.3%
1970	310		−7.2%
1980	279		−10.0%
1990	246		−11.8%
2000	281		14.2%
2010	280		−0.4%
2020	219		−21.8%
U.S. Decennial Census

=== 2010 census ===
As of the census of 2010, there were 280 people, 85 households, and 71 families living in the village. The population density was 682.9 inhabitants per square mile (263.7/km^{2}). There were 106 housing units at an average density of 258.5 per square mile (99.8/km^{2}). The racial makeup of the village was 96.8% White, 0.7% African American, 0.7% Asian, and 1.8% from two or more races. Hispanic or Latino of any race were 3.9% of the population.

There were 85 households, of which 43.5% had children under the age of 18 living with them, 57.6% were married couples living together, 21.2% had a female householder with no husband present, 4.7% had a male householder with no wife present, and 16.5% were non-families. 14.1% of all households were made up of individuals, and 4.8% had someone living alone who was 65 years of age or older. The average household size was 3.29 and the average family size was 3.54.

The median age in the village was 35.6 years. 31.1% of residents were under the age of 18; 9.5% were between the ages of 18 and 24; 25.5% were from 25 to 44; 20.3% were from 45 to 64; and 13.6% were 65 years of age or older. The gender makeup of the village was 49.6% male and 50.4% female.

=== 2000 census ===
As of the census of 2000, there were 281 people, 103 households, and 76 families living in the village. The population density was 682.4 inhabitants per square mile (263.5/km^{2}). There were 109 housing units at an average density of 264.7 per square mile (102.2/km^{2}). The racial makeup of the village was 98.22% White, 1.07% Asian, and 0.71% from two or more races. Hispanic or Latino of any race were 1.78% of the population.

There were 103 households, out of which 38.8% had children under the age of 18 living with them, 60.2% were married couples living together, 7.8% had a female householder with no husband present, and 26.2% were non-families. 21.4% of all households were made up of individuals, and 8.7% had someone living alone who was 65 years of age or older. The average household size was 2.73 and the average family size was 3.17.

In the village, the population was spread out, with 33.5% under the age of 18, 5.7% from 18 to 24, 27.8% from 25 to 44, 21.4% from 45 to 64, and 11.7% who were 65 years of age or older. The median age was 34 years. For every 100 females there were 102.2 males. For every 100 females age 18 and over, there were 105.5 males.

The median income for a household in the village was $30,750, and the median income for a family was $30,357. Males had a median income of $26,964 versus $23,125 for females. The per capita income for the village was $12,670. About 9.0% of families and 13.2% of the population were below the poverty line, including 19.2% of those under the age of eighteen and none of those 65 or over.

== Festivals ==
Tiro is home to the Testicle Festival every spring, featuring fried beef testicles. This event is put on by the Tiro Tavern, a bar/diner located in Tiro.

The origins of the testicle festival in Tiro trace back to c. 1988 when a couple named Don and Rosie and the owner of the Tiro Tavern, Alan Cramer, ate a few pounds of pig and calf testicles together. Cramer enjoyed the meal very much, so he decided to share it with his customers annually on the last Saturday of every April. Over time, a few pounds of testicles became over 600 pounds. The festival's motto is "You’ll have a ball".

== Notable person ==
- Russell Coffey, one of the last surviving World War I veterans
