= Russell Coffey =

- Born: September 1, 1898; Tiro, Ohio, U.S.
- Died: December 20, 2007 (aged 109)
- Military career
- Allegiance: United States of America
- Branch: United States Army
- Service years: October – December 1918
- Conflicts: World War I

James Russell Coffey Ed.D. (September 1, 1898 – December 20, 2007) was one of the last three American veterans of the First World War and also the oldest one of them.

== Biography ==
Born in Tiro, Ohio, Coffey enlisted in the United States Army in October 1918, about a month before the armistice was signed. He was a student at The College of Wooster, living in Creston and taking a streetcar to Akron, where he worked in a rubber factory to pay his tuition. Two older brothers already were serving overseas, and he never shipped out. Russell was honorably discharged that same December.

Coffey met his future wife, Bernice, in Creston. She lived one street away, and they courted from about the time of his Army discharge until their marriage in 1922. Their only child, Betty Jo, was born in 1923 and died in September 2007. At 84, she was his only immediate relative still living. He died in a nursing facility in North Baltimore.

Coffey finished his bachelor's and master's degrees in education at Ohio State University. He also received his doctorate in education at New York University.

From 1948 to 1969, Coffey served as a faculty member at Bowling Green State University in Ohio. He was also initiated into the Pi Kappa Alpha fraternity in 1964 by the Delta Beta Chapter at Bowling Green State University.

In June 2005, Coffey visited the Buckeye Boys State program at Bowling Green State University in Ohio.

By late March 2007, he was one of the last three known surviving American-born World War I veterans, as well as the oldest of them. He was also the oldest living brother of the Pi Kappa Alpha fraternity.
