= Spinach matsoni =

Salad from Georgian cuisine

- Place of origin: Georgia

Spinach matsoni (Georgian: ისპანახი მაწვნით, romanized: isp'anakhi mats'vnit) is a Georgian salad dish composed of cooked and minced spinach mixed with matsoni yoghurt. Garlic, salt and cilantro are added as flavouring to the dish while preparing.

== See also ==
- Green sauce
- Salsa verde
- Tzatziki
