= Lamb fries =

Fried lamb testicles

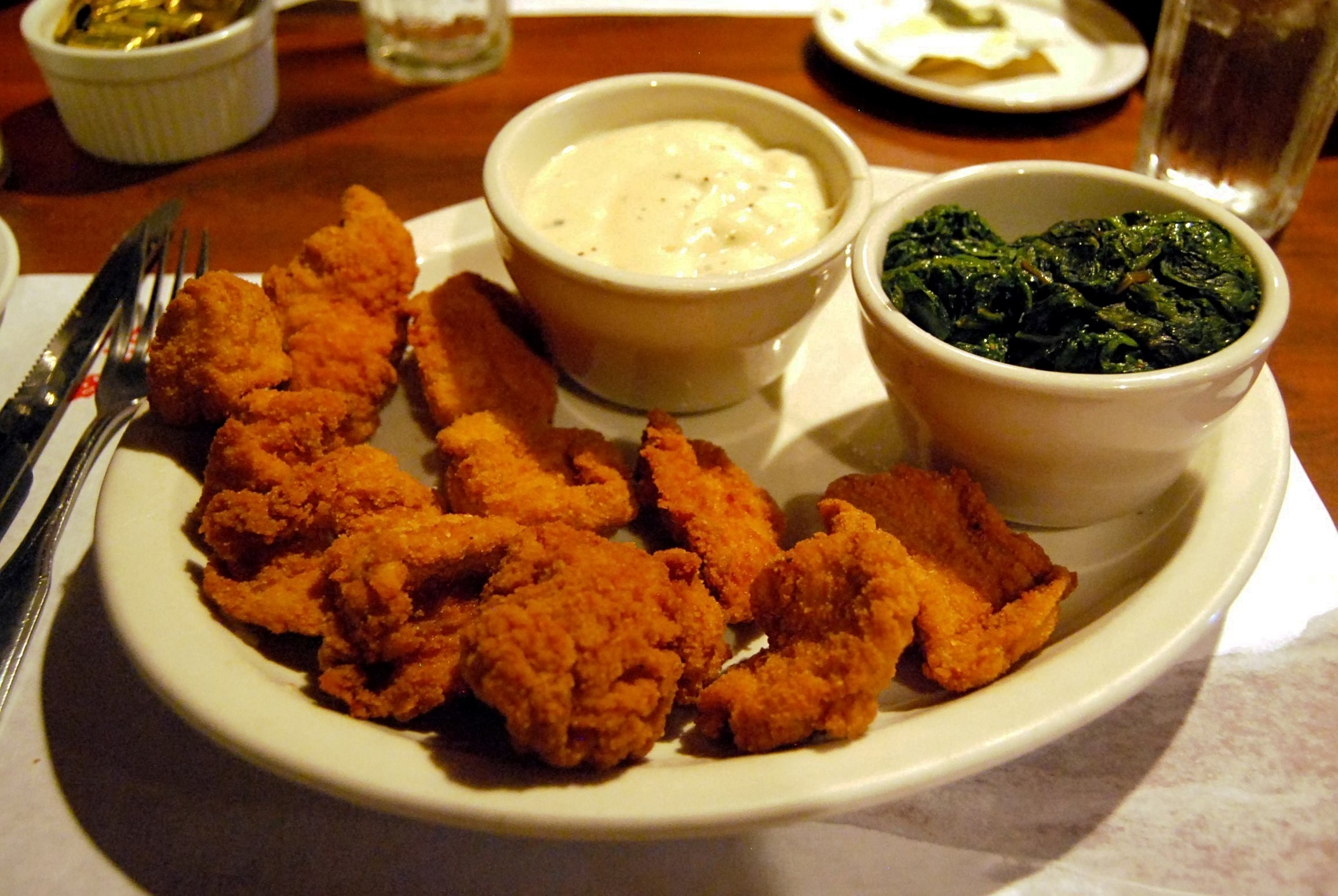
Platter of lamb fries

Lamb fries are lamb testicles used as food. Historically they were parboiled, cut in half, and seasoned. Lamb testicles are served in a variety of cuisines, including Basque, breaded and fried in some barbecue restaurants, Chinese, Caucasian, Persian and Iranian Armenian (called donbalan), and Turkish. The dish is rarely served at restaurants in the United States, but can occasionally be found at Iranian restaurants.

Lamb fries, often served in a cream gravy, have been claimed to be, by some scholars, a traditional dish in the Bluegrass region of Kentucky. Some experts have stated that the dish is more specific to the Lexington region, rather than applying to the region at large.

== See also ==
- List of lamb dishes
- Rocky Mountain oysters
- Testicle (food)
