= Rocky Mountain oysters =

Fried bull testicles

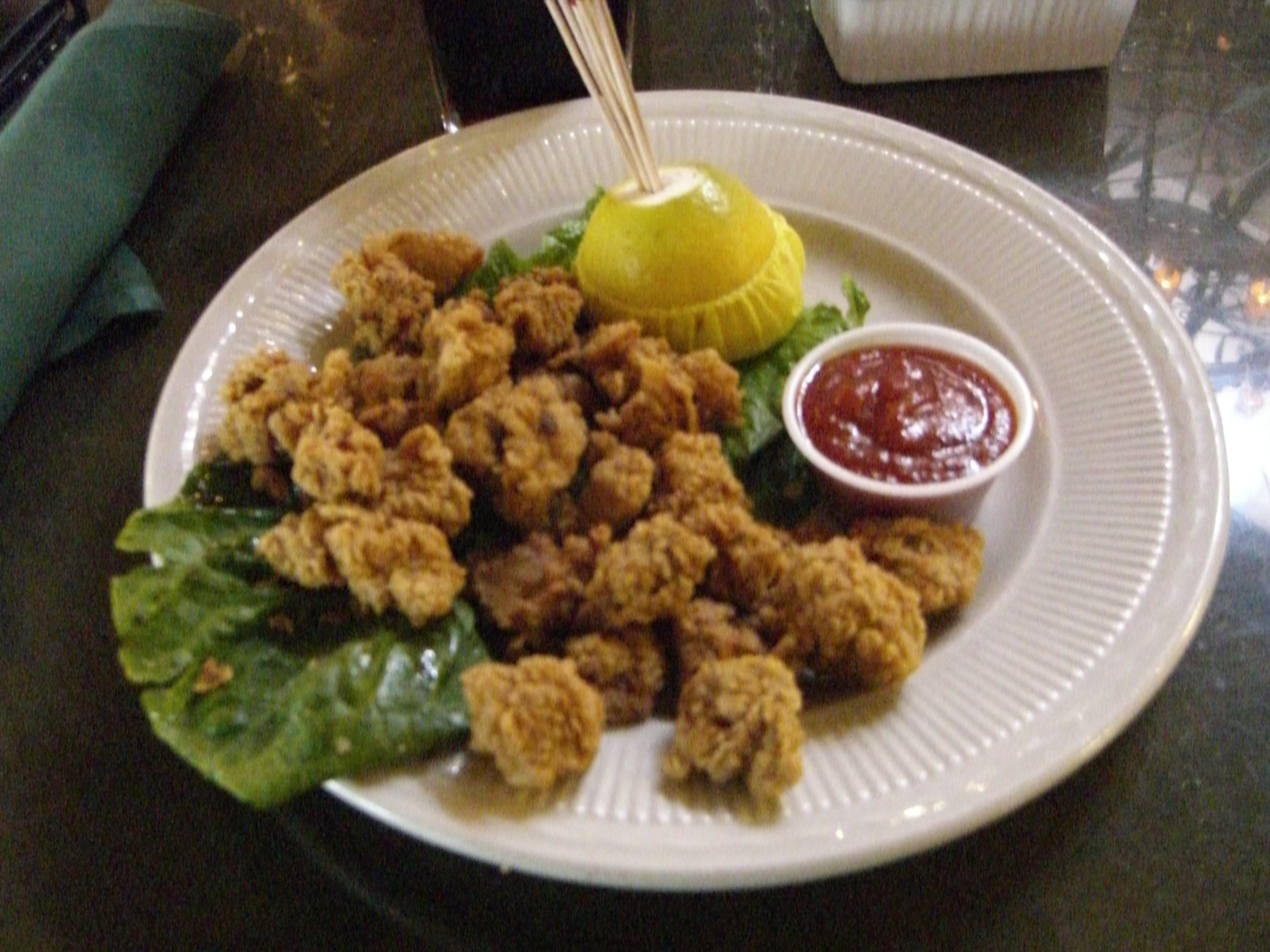
- Rocky Mountain oysters, served with lemon and cocktail sauce.
- Alternative names: Prairie oysters, calf fries, cowboy oysters, swinging steak
- Course: Hors d'oeuvre
- Region or state: Western North America and South America
- Serving temperature: Hot
- Main ingredients: Beef testicles, flour, pepper, salt
- Food energy (per 1 cup serving): 182 kcal (760 kJ)

Rocky Mountain oysters, mountain oysters, or prairie balls, also known as prairie oysters in Canada (French: animelles), is a dish made from bulls’ testicles. The organs are often deep-fried after being skinned, coated in flour, pepper and salt, and sometimes pounded flat. The dish is most often served as an appetizer.

== Description ==
The dish is served in parts of Canada, where cattle ranching is prevalent and castration of young male animals is common. "Prairie oysters" is the preferred name in Canada where they are served in a demi-glace. In Oklahoma and the Texas Panhandle, they are often called calf fries. In Spain, Argentina and many parts of Mexico, they are referred to as criadillas, and they are colloquially referred to as huevos de toro (literally, "bull's eggs"; besides its literal meaning, huevos is a Spanish slang term for testicles) in Central and South America. A few other terms, such as "cowboy caviar", "Montana tendergroins", "dusted nuts", "swinging beef", or simply "mountain oysters" may be used.

The dish, purportedly cowboy fare, is most commonly found served at festivals, amongst ranching families, or at certain specialty eating establishments and bars. They are, however, also readily available at some public venues (e.g., at Coors Field during Colorado Rockies baseball games). Eagle, Idaho, claims to have the "World's Largest Rocky Mountain Oyster Feed" during its Eagle Fun Days (now held the second weekend in July). Clinton, Montana; Deerfield, Michigan; Huntley, Illinois; Sesser, Illinois; Olean, Missouri; Severance, Colorado; and Tiro, Ohio also hold testicle festivals. Virginia City, Nevada holds a Rocky Mountain Oyster Fry in conjunction with St. Patrick's Day each year. Rocky Mountain oysters are sometimes served as a prank to those unaware of the origin of these "oysters". They are considered to be an aphrodisiac by many people.

The primary goal of testicle removal is not culinary. Castration in veterinary practice and animal husbandry is common and serves a variety of purposes, including the control of breeding, the growth of skeletal muscle suitable for beef, and temperament alteration.

== Similar dishes ==
Testicles from other animals are also eaten. The most common is lamb fries (not to be confused with lamb's fry which is lamb liver) made with testicles from castrated sheep. Pig testicles are used to make "pig fries".

Another dish found on occasion is turkey fries made from turkey testes. These are sometimes known as "short fries" as well.

== See also ==
- Lamb fry
- List of beef dishes
- List of deep fried foods
- List of hors d'oeuvre
- Soup Number Five
- Testicles as food
