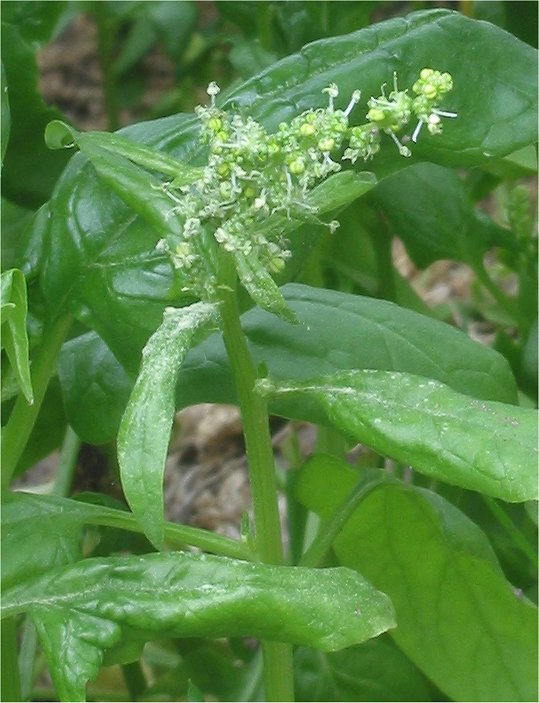

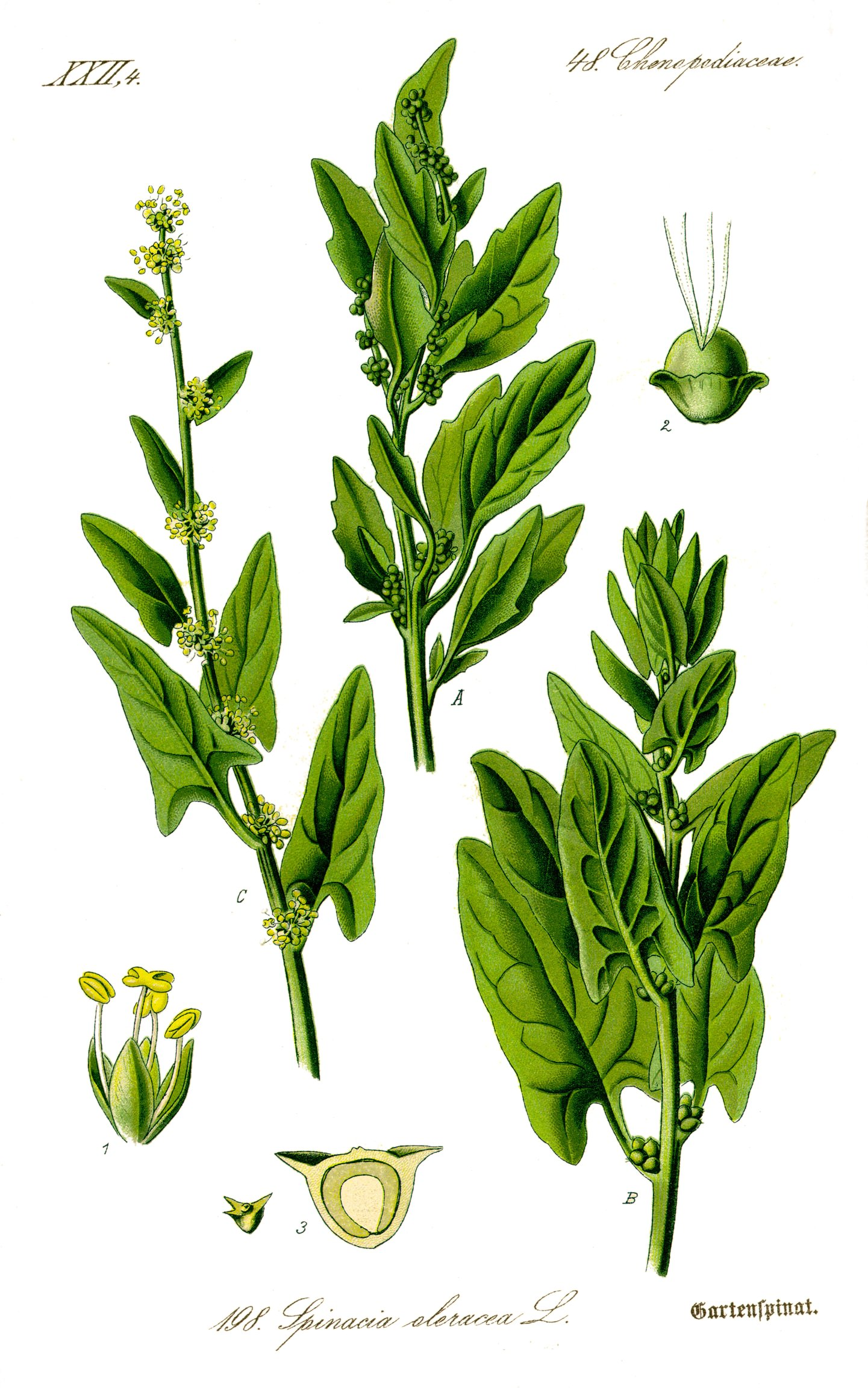

Scientific classification
- Kingdom: Plantae
- Clade: Tracheophytes
- Clade: Angiosperms
- Clade: Eudicots
- Order: Caryophyllales
- Family: Amaranthaceae
- Genus: Spinacia
- Species: S. oleracea

Binomial name
- Spinacia oleracea L.

= Spinach =

Species of flowering plant

Spinach (Spinacia oleracea) is a leafy green flowering plant native to Central and Western Asia. It is of the order Caryophyllales, family Amaranthaceae, subfamily Chenopodioideae. Its leaves are a common vegetable consumed either fresh, cooked or after storage (using preservation techniques like canning, freezing, or dehydration). The taste differs considerably between cooked and raw: the high oxalate content may be reduced by blanching.

It is an annual plant (rarely biennial), growing as tall as 30 cm (1 ft). Spinach may overwinter in temperate regions. The leaves are alternate, simple, ovate to triangular, and very variable in size: 2–30 cm (1–12 in) long and 1–15 cm (1/2–6 in) broad, with larger leaves at the base of the plant and small leaves higher on the flowering stem. The flowers are inconspicuous, yellow-green, 3–4 mm (1/8–5/32 in) in diameter, and mature into a small, hard, dry, lumpy fruit cluster 5–10 mm (1/4–3/8 in) across containing several seeds.

In 2024, world production of spinach was 31 million tonnes, with China alone accounting for 92% of the total.

== Etymology ==
The English word 'spinach' appeared in the late 14th century from the Old French word espinache. The name derived from medieval Latin spinagium, borrowed from Andalusian Arabic, isbinakh, which in turn derived from Persian aspānāḵ.

== Taxonomy ==
Common spinach (S. oleracea) was long considered to be in the family Chenopodiaceae, but in 2003 that family was merged into the Amaranthaceae in the order Caryophyllales. Within the family Amaranthaceae sensu lato, Spinach belongs to the subfamily Chenopodioideae.

== Description ==
As opposed to most flowering plants used as vegetables, spinach is a dioecious plant, meaning different plants can have either female or male flowers. (Note: Asparagus and sorrel are the other notable exceptions.) The flowers are small, green and wind pollinated.

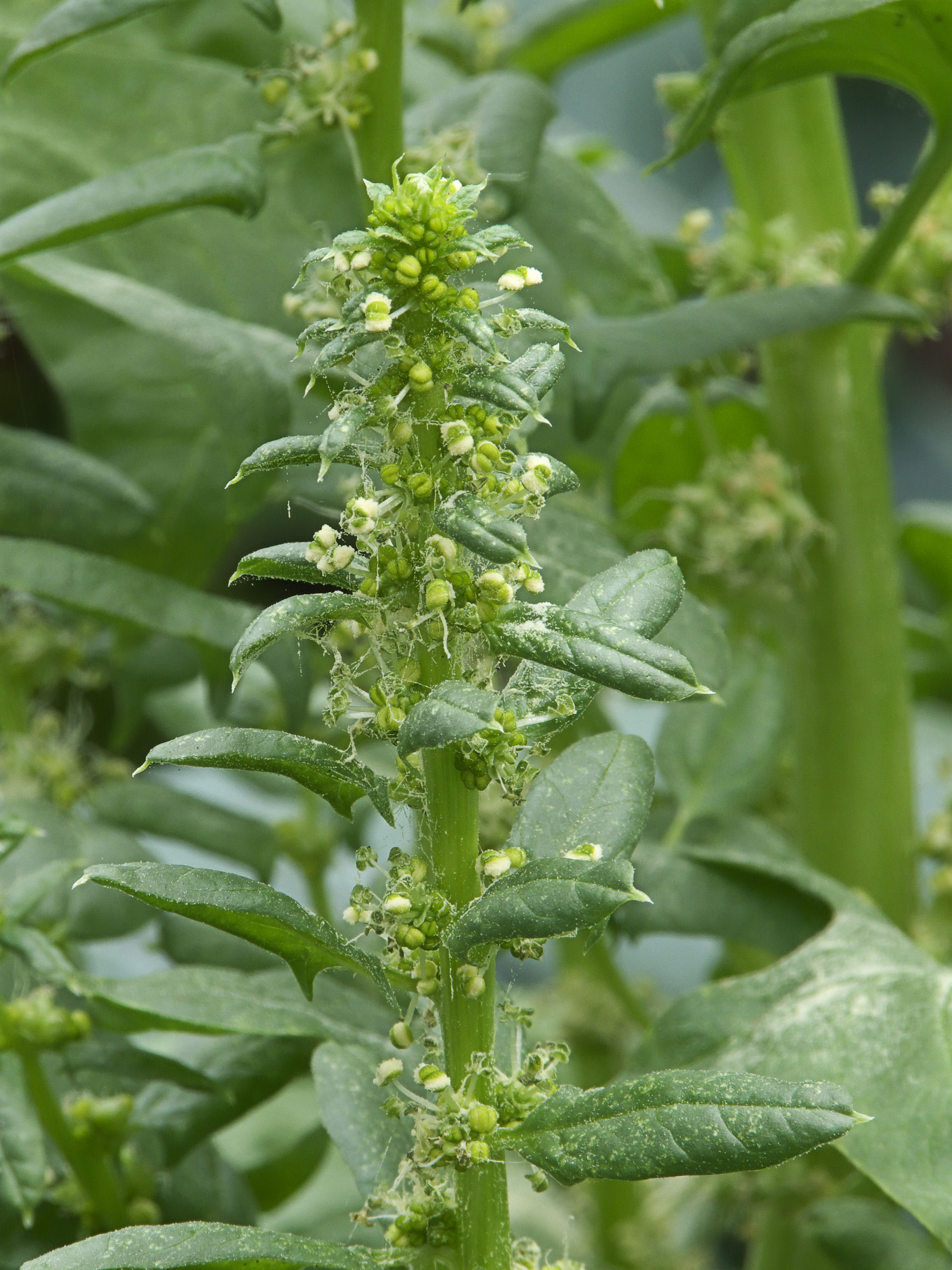
Male flowers

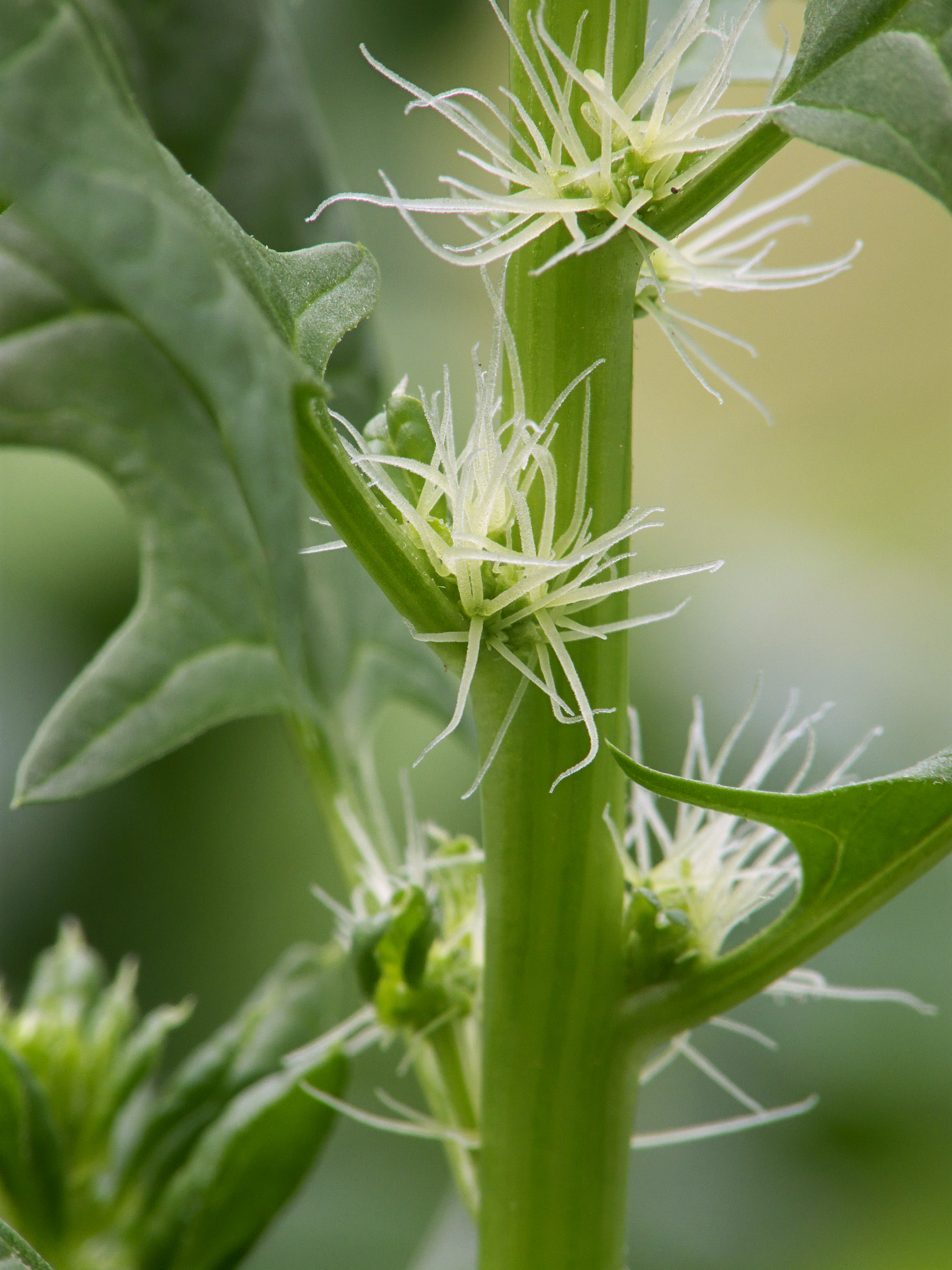
Female flowers

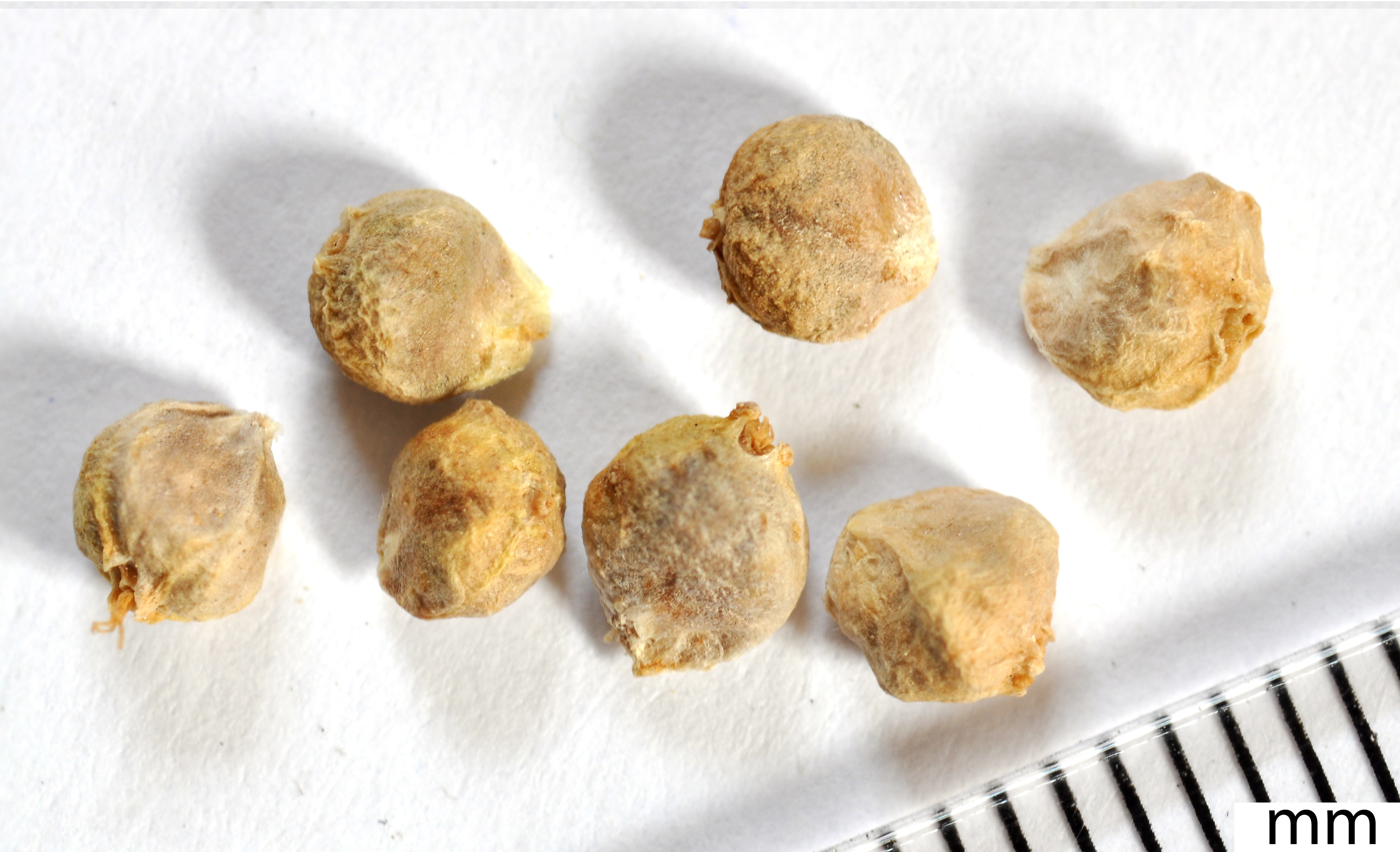
Round seeds of the 'Monnopa' cultivar

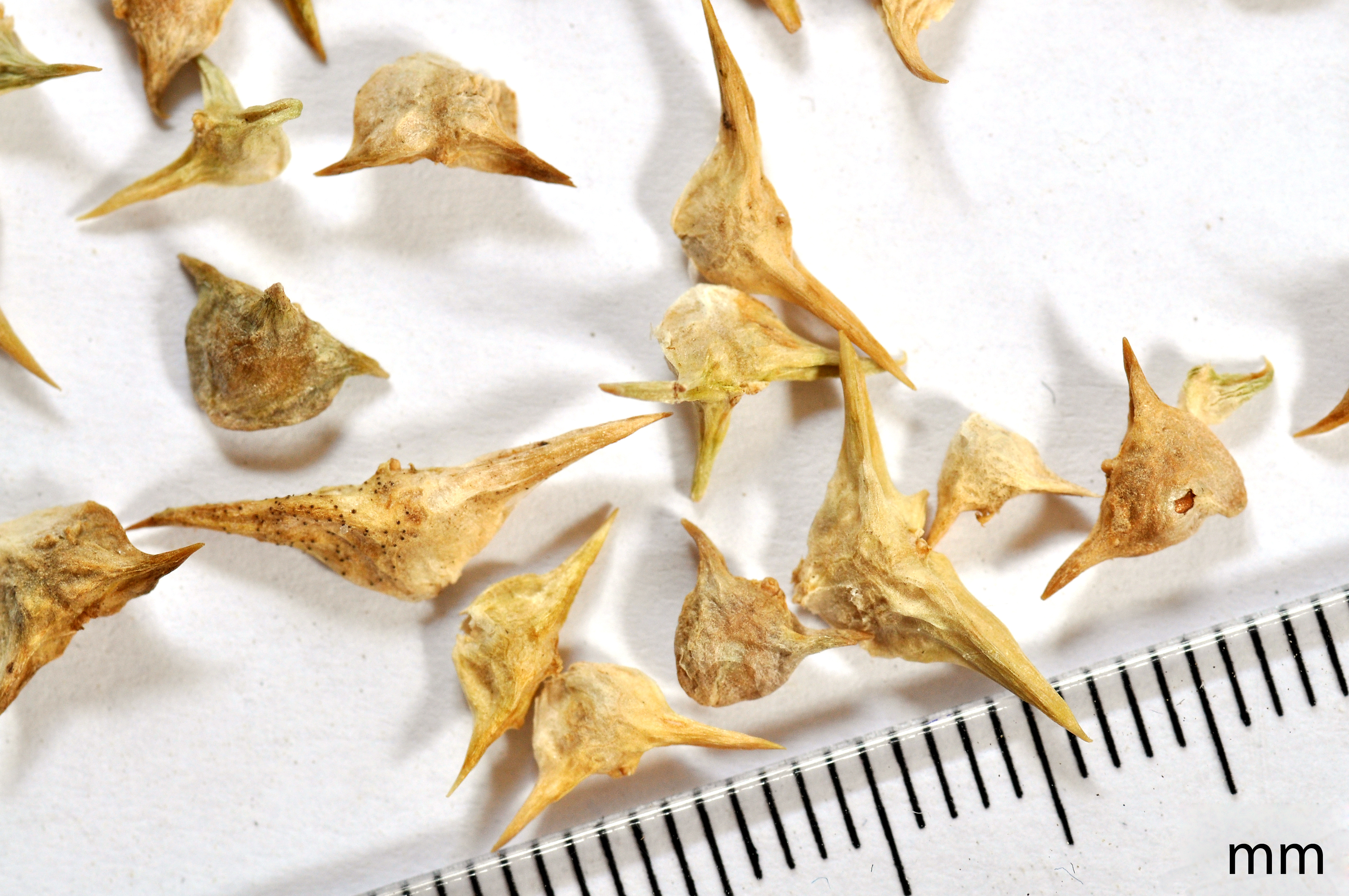
Spiky seeds of the 'Erste Ernte' cultivar

== History ==
Spinach may have originated about 2,000 years ago in parts of Iran and Indian subcontinent from where it was introduced to ancient China via Nepal. In 827 CE, the Arabs introduced spinach to Sicily. The first written evidence of spinach in the Mediterranean region was recorded in three 10th-century works: work by al-Rāzī (known as Rhazes in the West) and in two agricultural treatises by Ibn Waḥshīyah and Qusṭus al-Rūmī. Spinach became a common vegetable in the Arab Mediterranean and arrived in the Iberian Peninsula by the latter part of the 12th century, where Ibn al-ʻAwwām called it raʼīs al-buqūl, 'the chieftain of leafy greens'. Spinach was the subject of an 11th century treatise by Ibn Ḥajjāj.

Spinach first appeared in England and France in the 14th century, probably via Iberia, and gained common use because it appeared in early spring when fresh local vegetables were not available. Spinach is mentioned in the first known English cookbook, the Forme of Cury (1390), where it is referred to as 'spinnedge' and 'spynoches'. During World War I, wine fortified with spinach juice was given to injured French soldiers with the intent to curtail their bleeding.

== Culinary use ==
=== Nutrients ===
Spinach, raw
Nutritional value per 100 g (3.5 oz)
- Energy: 97 kJ (23 kcal)
- Carbohydrates: 3.6 g
- Sugars: 0.4 g
- Dietary fiber: 2.2 g
- Fat: 0.4 g
- Protein: 2.9 g
Vitamins and minerals
Vitamins	Quantity %DV^{†}
Vitamin A equiv. beta-Carotene lutein zeaxanthin	52% 469 μg 52% 5626 μg 12198 μg
Vitamin A	9377 IU
Thiamine (B1)	7% 0.078 mg
Riboflavin (B2)	15% 0.189 mg
Niacin (B3)	5% 0.724 mg
Vitamin B6	11% 0.195 mg
Folate (B9)	49% 194 μg
Vitamin C	31% 28 mg
Vitamin E	13% 2 mg
Vitamin K	403% 483 μg
Minerals	Quantity %DV^{†}
Calcium	8% 99 mg
Iron	15% 2.71 mg
Magnesium	19% 79 mg
Manganese	39% 0.897 mg
Phosphorus	4% 49 mg
Potassium	19% 558 mg
Sodium	3% 79 mg
Zinc	5% 0.53 mg
- Other constituents: Quantity
- Water: 91.4 g
- Link to USDA database entry
- ^{†}Percentages estimated using US recommendations for adults, except for potassium, which is estimated based on expert recommendation from the National Academies.

Raw spinach is 91% water, 4% carbohydrates, 3% protein, and contains negligible fat (table). In a 100-gram (3 1/2-ounce) reference serving providing 97 kilojoules (23 kilocalories) of food energy, spinach has a high nutritional value, especially when fresh, frozen, steamed, or quickly boiled. It is a rich source (20% or more of the Daily Value, DV) of vitamin A, vitamin C, manganese, and folate (31-52% DV), with an especially high content of vitamin K (403% DV) (table). Spinach is a moderate source (10–19% of DV) of the B vitamins, riboflavin and vitamin B_{6}, vitamin E, potassium, iron, magnesium, and dietary fiber (table).

=== Cooking and oxalates ===
Spinach contains oxalates, which may inhibit absorption of calcium and iron in the stomach and small intestine. Cooked spinach, such as by blanching, has lower levels of oxalates, allowing some micronutrients to be absorbed more completely.

Cooking spinach significantly decreases its vitamin C concentration, as vitamin C is degraded by heating. Folate levels may also be decreased, as folate tends to leach into cooking liquid.

Spinach is rich in nitrates and nitrites, which may exceed safe levels if spinach is over-consumed.

=== Cuisine ===
Spinach is eaten raw, in salads, and cooked in soups, curries, or casseroles. Dishes with spinach as a main ingredient include spinach salad, spinach soup, spinach dip, saag paneer, pkhali, ispanakhi matsvnit, and spanakopita.

In classical French cuisine, a spinach-based dish may be described as à la Florentine.

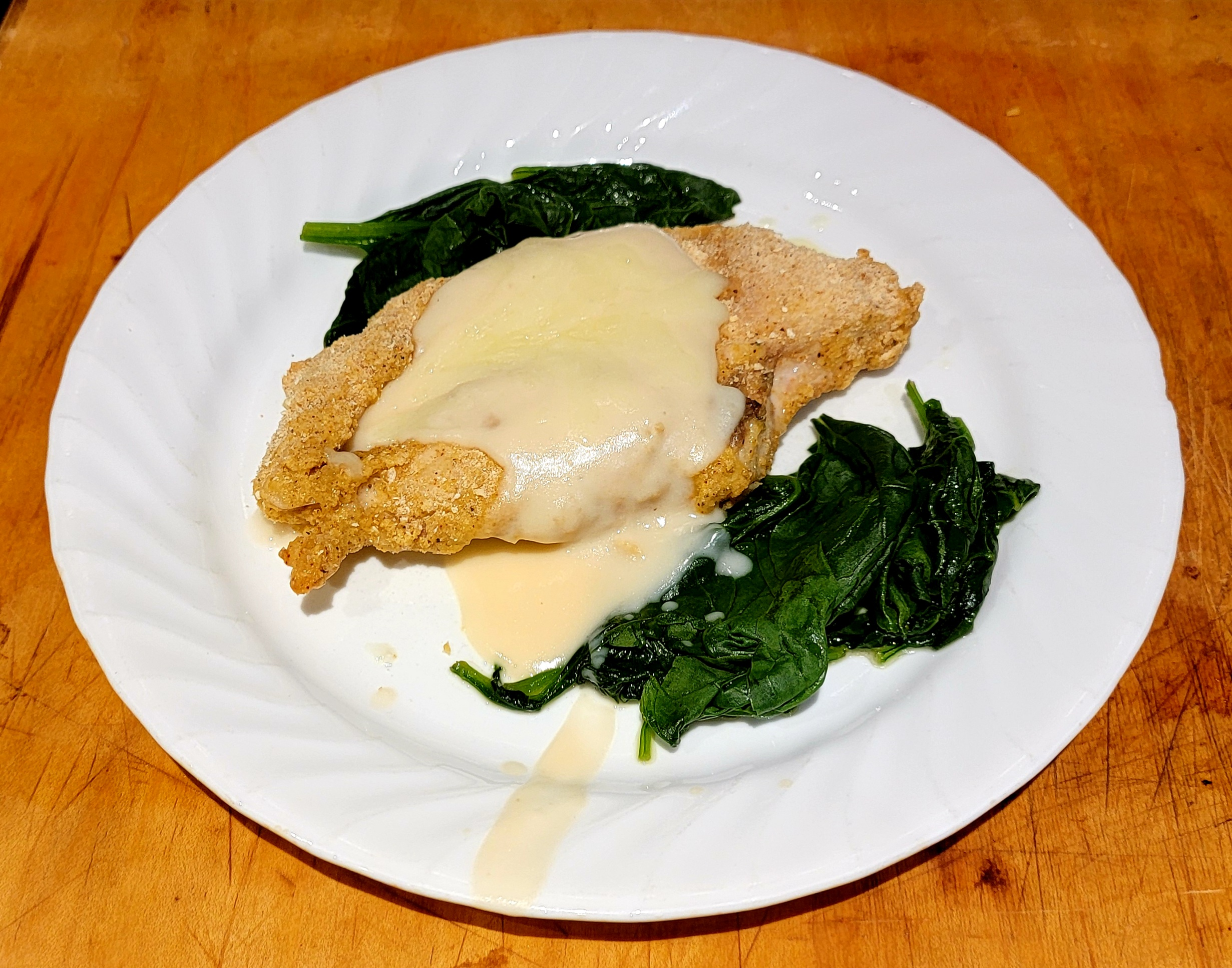
Chicken Florentine, meaning with spinach

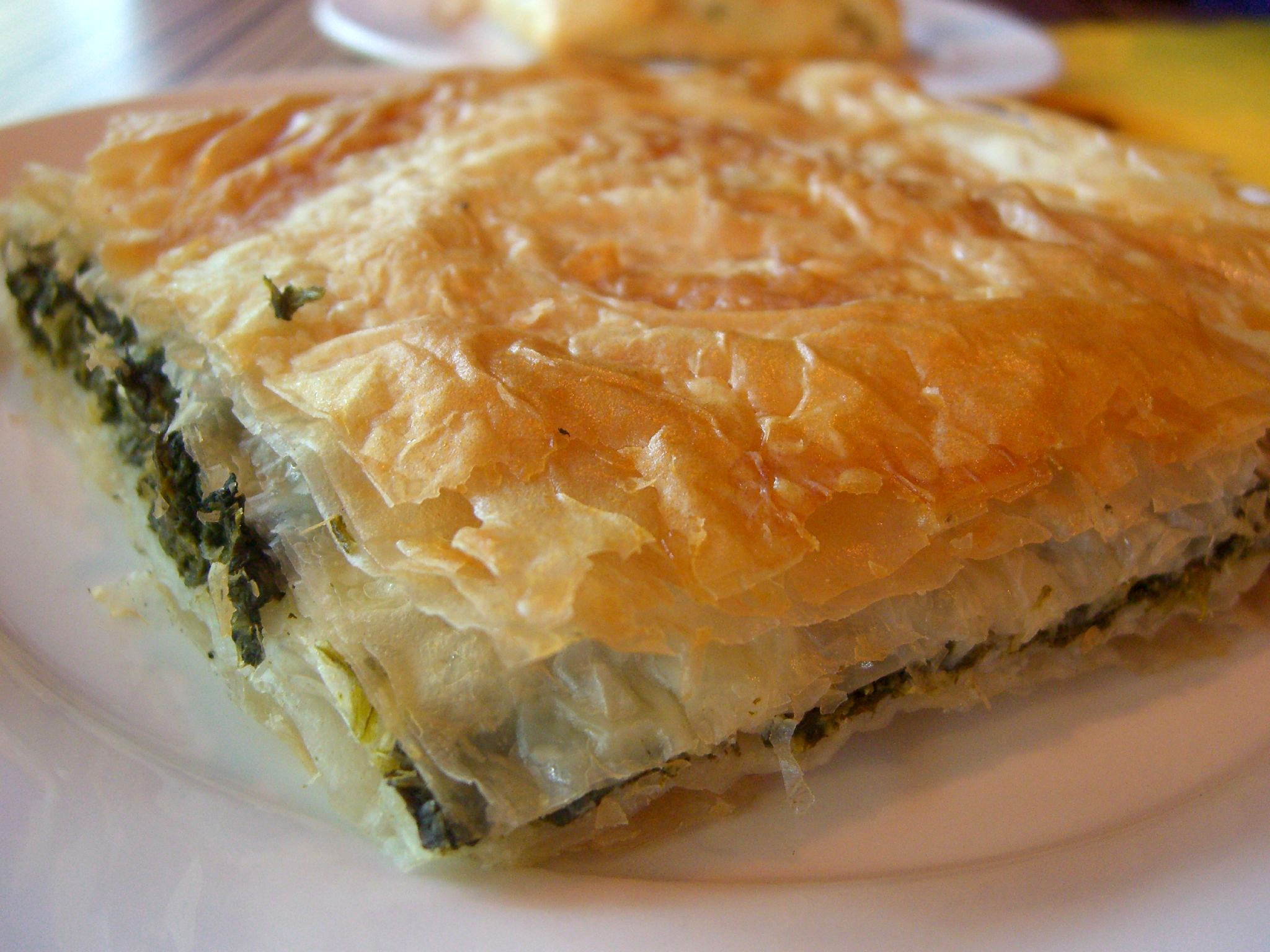
Spanakopita, a Greek spinach pastry

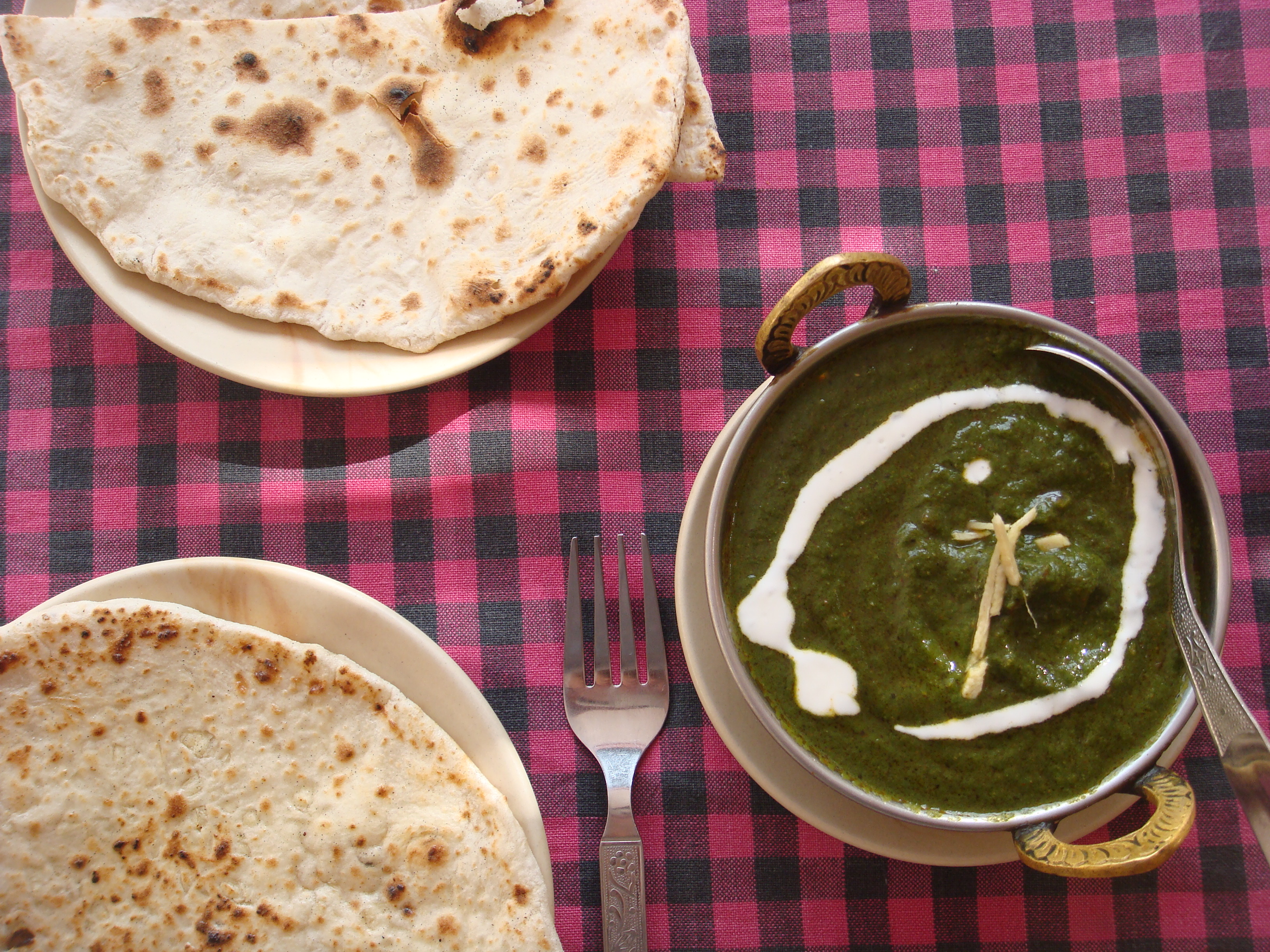
Saag gosht, an Indian dish

== Production ==
Spinach production 2024, millions of tonnes
China	28.3
United States	0.3
Japan	0.2
Turkey	0.2
World	30.7
Source: UN Food and Agriculture Organization, Statistics Division

In 2024, world production of spinach was 31 million tonnes, with China alone accounting for 92% of the total (table).

Production of spinach

Spinach yield

=== Marketing and safety ===
Fresh spinach is sold loose, bunched, or packaged fresh in bags. Fresh spinach loses much of its nutritional value with storage of more than a few days. Fresh spinach is packaged in air, or in nitrogen gas to extend shelf life. While refrigeration slows this effect to about eight days, fresh spinach loses most of its folate and carotenoid content over this period of time. For longer storage, it is canned, or blanched or cooked and frozen.

Some packaged spinach is exposed to radiation to kill any harmful bacteria. The Food and Drug Administration approves of irradiation of spinach leaves up to an absorbed dose of 4.0 kilograys, having no or only a minor effect on nutrient content.

Spinach may be high in cadmium contamination depending on the soil and location where the spinach is grown.

Due to spinach's high content of vitamin K, individuals taking the anticoagulant warfarin, which acts by inhibiting vitamin K, are instructed to minimize consumption of spinach (and other dark green leafy vegetables).

== In popular culture ==
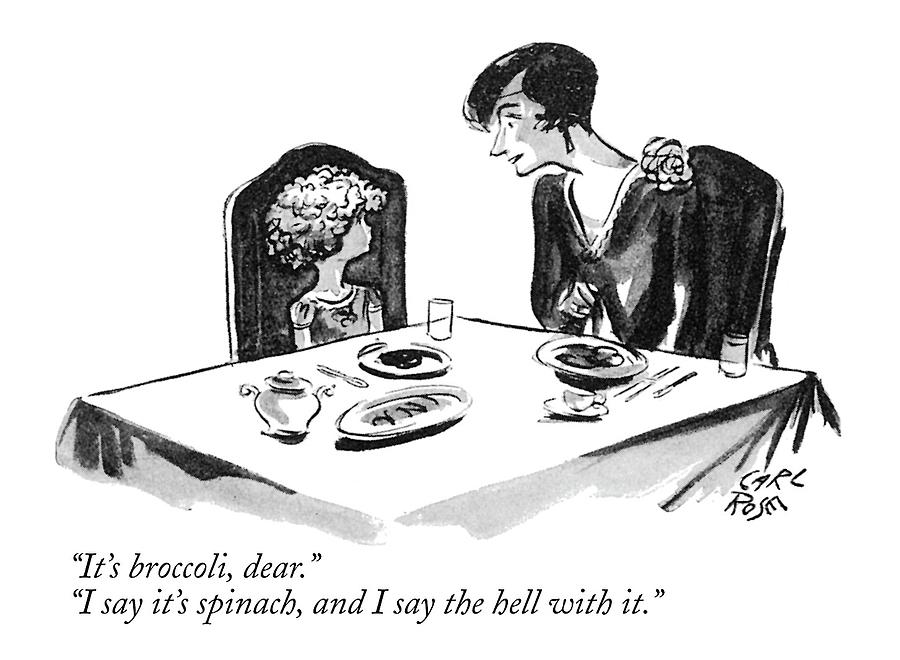
The American phrase "I say it's spinach" meaning "nonsense" comes from a 1928 cartoon in The New Yorker.

The comics and cartoon character Popeye the Sailor Man is portrayed as gaining strength by consuming canned spinach. The accompanying song lyric is: "I'm strong to the finich [sic], 'cuz I eats me spinach." This is usually attributed to the iron content of spinach, but in a 1932 strip, Popeye states that "spinach is full of vitamin A" and that is what makes people strong and healthy. As it happens, spinach is not a better source of dietary iron than many other vegetables. The false idea that spinach is an especially good source of dietary iron is an academic urban legend.

== See also ==
- Green leafy vegetable
- Ipomoea aquatica
- Kale
- Mountain spinach
- Palmer amaranth
- Spinach in the United States
- Tetragonia tetragonioides
- White goosefoot
