= Testicle festival =

Annual food event in many communities

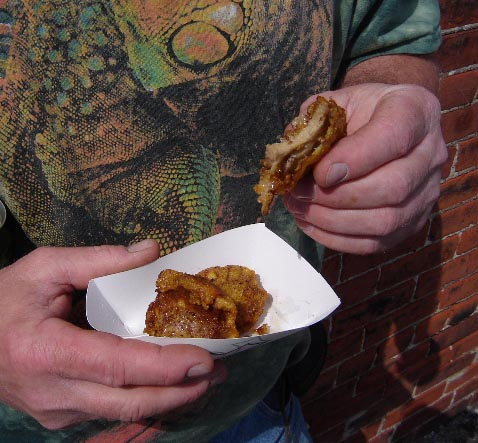
A visitor consuming a deep-fried testicle at the Tiro Testicle Festival

A testicle festival is an event where the featured activity is the consumption of animal testicles, usually battered and fried.

The oldest of such festivals takes place in Byron, Illinois, and features turkey testicles. Similar festivals in the US are held in Deerfield, Michigan; Olean, Missouri; Tiro, Ohio; Oakdale, California; Ashland, Nebraska; Huntley, Illinois; Stillwater, Oklahoma; Salmon, Idaho; Clinton, Montana; Suring, Wisconsin, Dundas, Wisconsin, LaValle, Wisconsin, Severance, Colorado, and Bentonville, Arkansas, some of which feature Rocky mountain oysters (cattle testicles). The Montana State Society has held an annual Rocky Mountain Oyster Festival in Clinton, Montana, since 2005.

Every year in September, the villages of Ozrem and Lunjevica in the municipality of Gornji Milanovac, Serbia, host the World Gonad Cooking Championship. The festival serves up a variety of testicles, including wildlife. It also gives awards for "ballsy" newsmakers. U.S. Presidents Donald Trump and Barack Obama and pilot "Sully" Sullenberger won awards in 2010.

== See also ==
- Testicles as food
