= Florentine (culinary term) =

Term in French cuisine

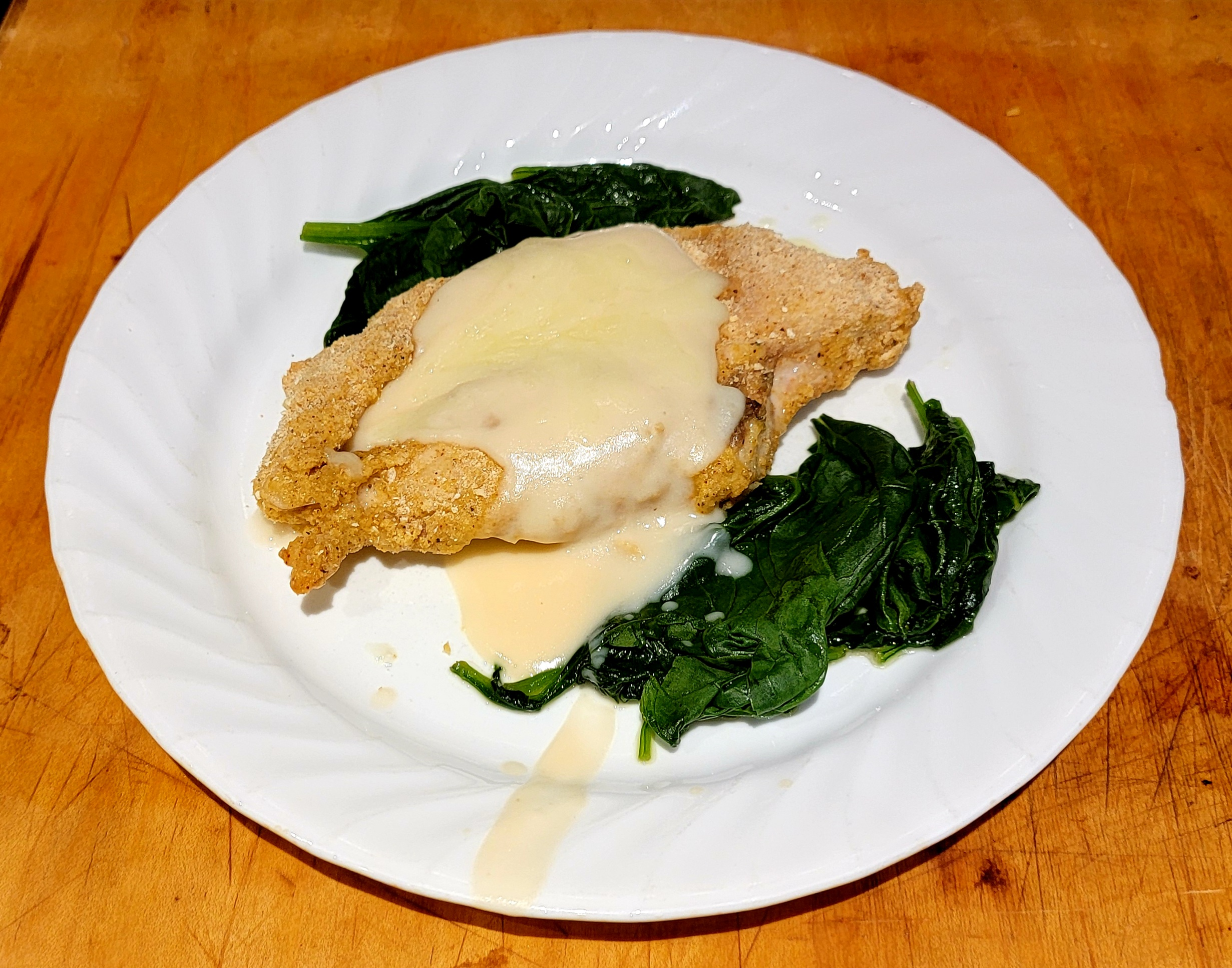
Home-cooked chicken Florentine

Florentine or à la Florentine is a term from classic French cuisine that refers to dishes that typically include a base of cooked spinach, a protein component and Mornay sauce. Chicken Florentine is the most popular version. Because Mornay sauce is a derivation of béchamel sauce which includes roux and requires time and skill to prepare correctly, many contemporary recipes use simpler cream-based sauces.

== History ==
The term dates back to 1533, when Catherine de Medici of Florence married Henry II of France. She supposedly brought a staff of chefs, lots of kitchen equipment and a love of spinach to Paris, and popularized Florentine-style dishes. Food historians have debunked this story, and Italian influence on French cuisine long predates this marriage. Pierre Franey considered this theory apocryphal, but embraced the term Florentine in 1983.

Auguste Escoffier included a recipe for sole Florentine in his 1903 classic Le guide culinaire, translated into English as A Guide to Modern Cookery. It is recipe 831 in that translation. Escoffier called for poaching the fish in butter and fumet, a stock made of fish bones, cooking the spinach in butter, covering the dish with Mornay sauce, garnishing it with grated cheese, and finishing it in an oven or salamander. In his 1936 cookbook L'Art culinaire moderne which was first translated for American cooks in 1966 as Modern French Culinary Art, Henri-Paul Pellaprat included five recipes for spinach-based Florentine dishes with Mornay sauce. The protein components were chicken breasts, cod fillets, sweetbreads, stuffed lamb breast and oysters. Craig Claiborne published a recipe for oysters Florentine with Mornay sauce in The New York Times in 1958.

== Variations ==
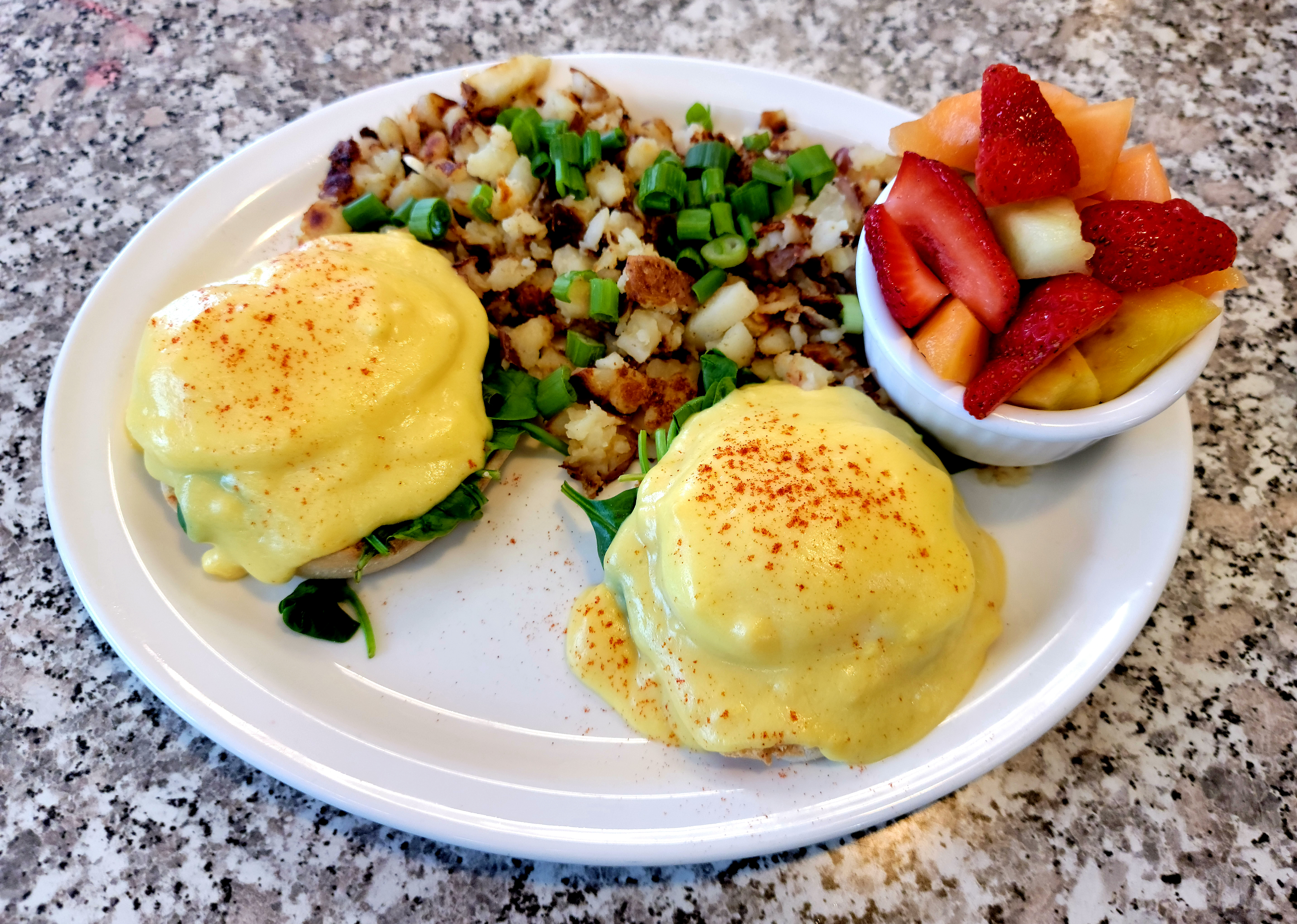
Eggs Florentine, served with country-fried potatoes and fresh fruit, at an Original Mel's restaurant

A quiche containing spinach is often called "quiche Florentine". Poached or soft-cooked eggs served on spinach with a Mornay sauce or equivalent is often called "eggs Florentine".

== Chicken Florentine ==
Chicken Florentine gained popularity in the United States as early as 1931, although the quality of the dish was uneven. Canned mushroom soup was sometimes used as a quick sauce in the years that followed. By the 1960s and 1970s, the general quality of the dish had deteriorated to "casserole" and "wedding banquet" food.

Writing in The New York Times in 1971, Claiborne praised a restaurant version of chicken Florentine, describing the chicken as "batter‐cooked and served with mushrooms in a lemon sauce". Contemporary cookbook authors are attempting to "restore" the dish to "its elegant roots", with "clearer, brighter flavors".

== See also ==
- Bistecca alla fiorentina
- Florentine biscuit
