= Testicles as food =

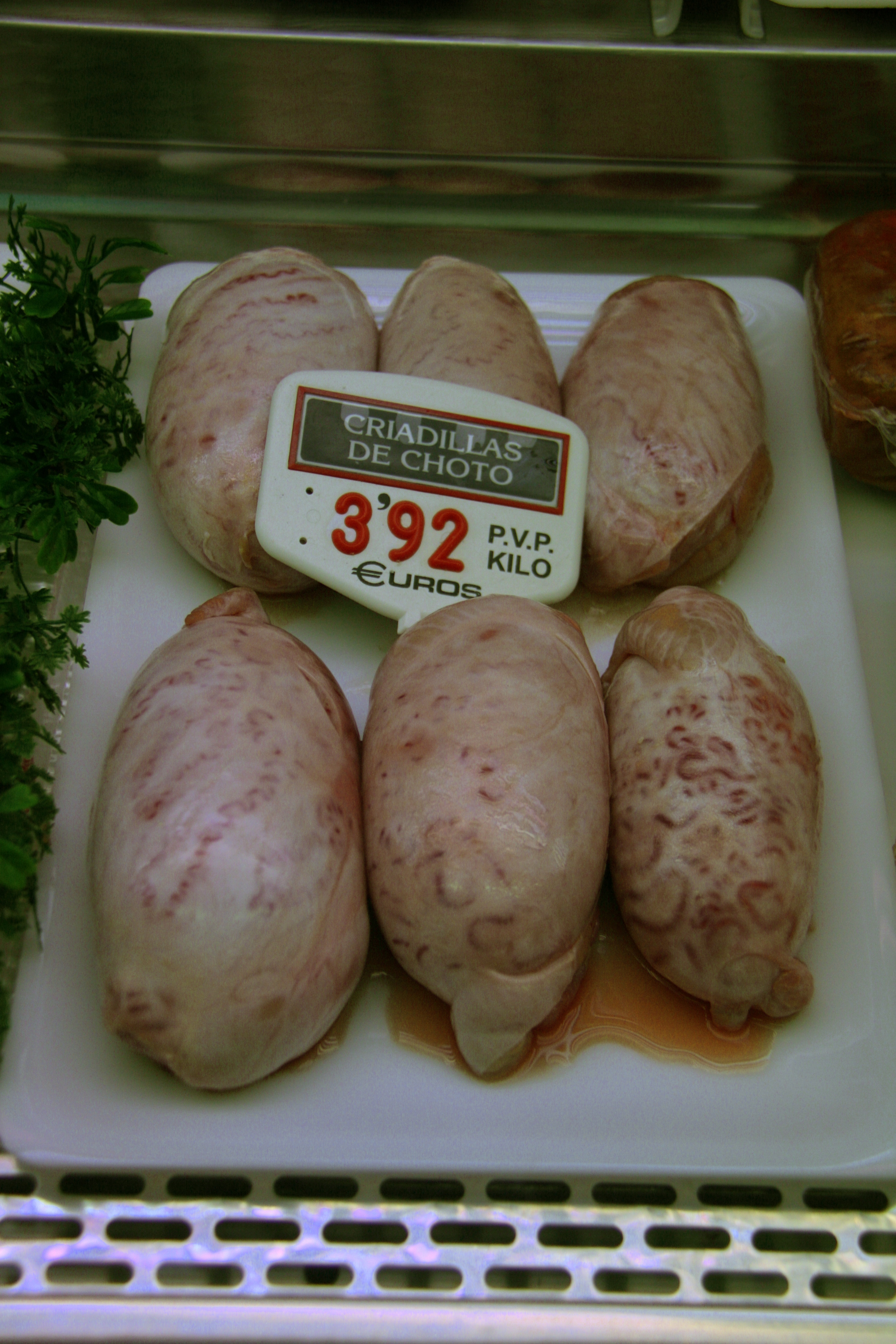
Goat testicles at a market in Spain (2009)

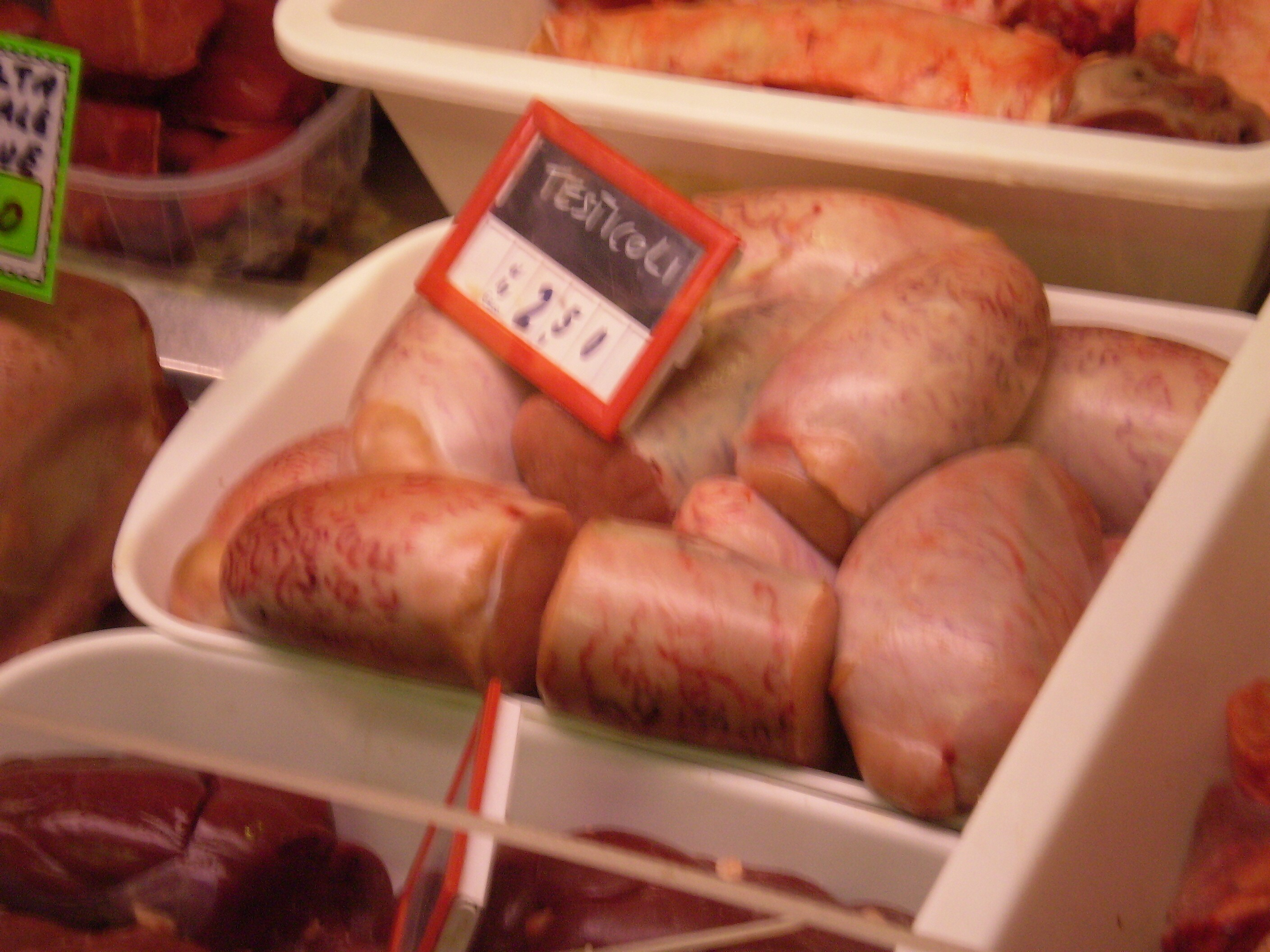
Beef testicles at a market in Italy (2007)

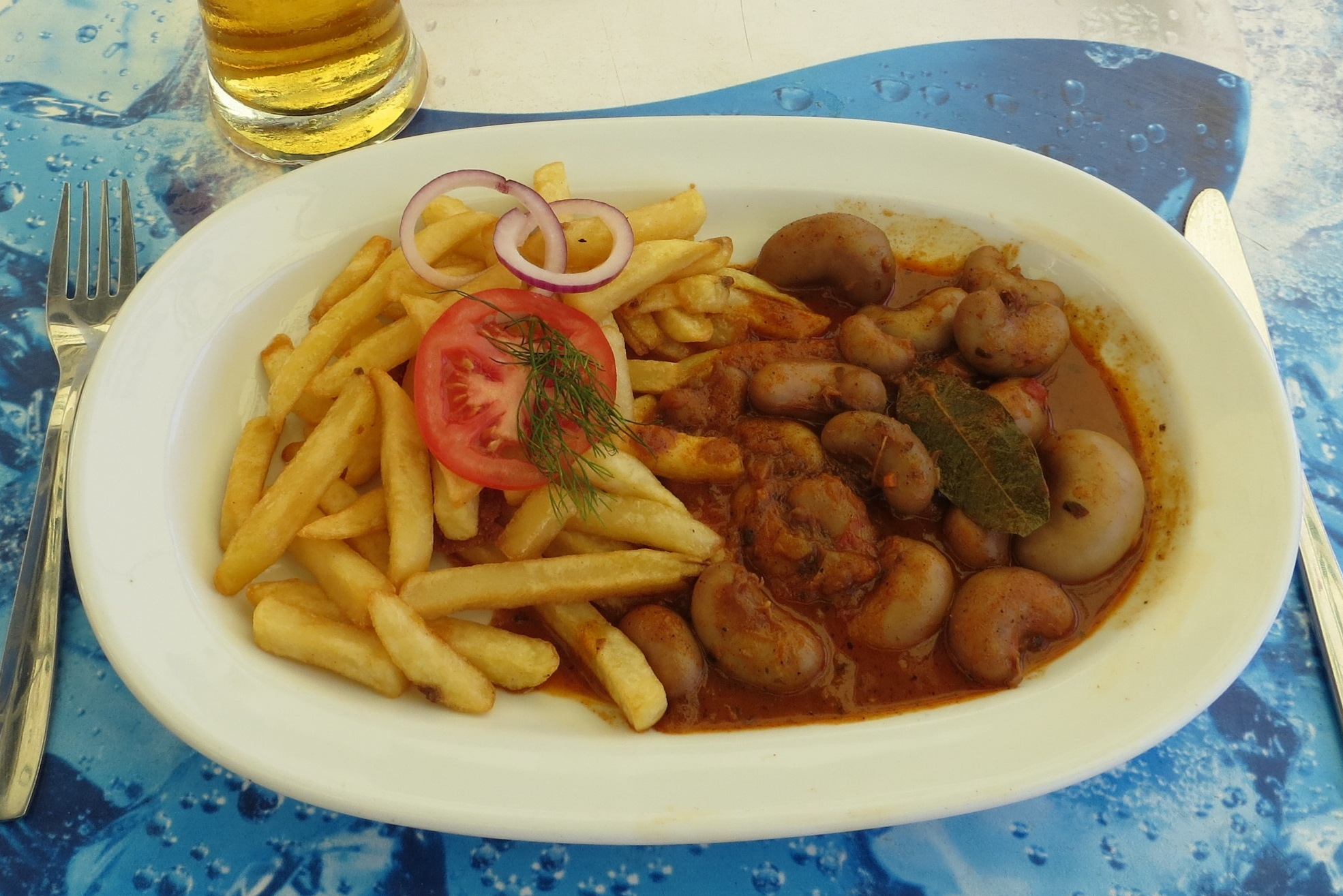
Rooster testicle stew (kakashere pörkölt) in Hungary (2013)

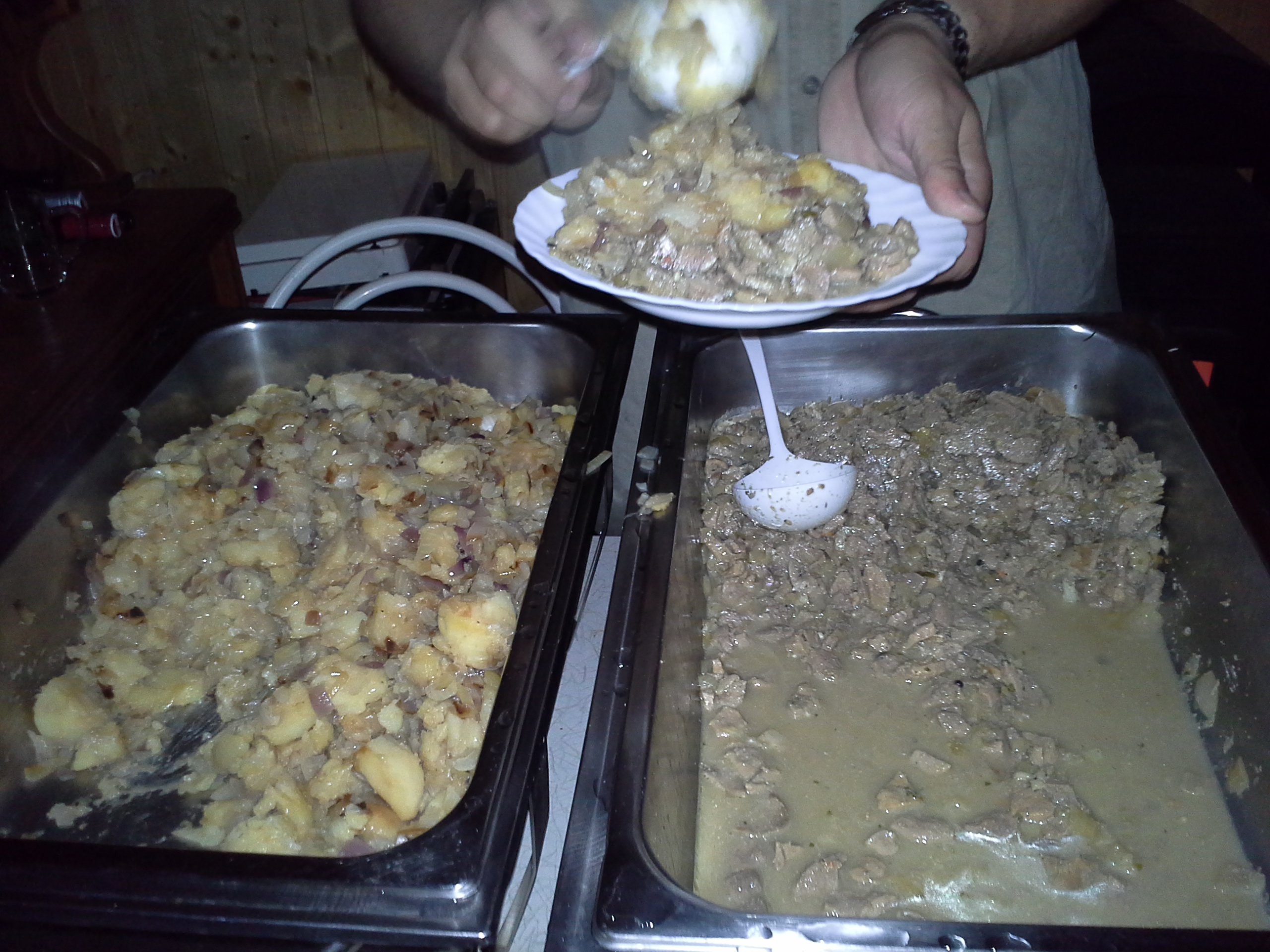
Bulls testicle stew (right) in Austria (2014)

The testicles of calves, lambs, roosters, turkeys, and other animals are eaten in many parts of the world, often under euphemistic culinary names. Testicles are a by-product of the castration of young animals raised for meat, so they were originally a late-spring seasonal specialty, though nowadays they are generally available year-round.

== Cookery ==
Testicles are cooked in a variety of ways: sautéed and sauced, fricasseed, deep-fried with breading or batter, in pies, poached, roasted, and so on. Before cooking, they are generally scalded, skinned, and soaked in cold water.

== Names ==
In English, testicles are known by a wide variety of euphemisms, including stones, Rocky Mountain oysters, and prairie oysters. Lamb testicles are often called lamb fries or simply fries (though that may also refer to other organ meats).

Euphemisms are used in many other languages. In Arabic countries such as Lebanon, Syria and Iraq they are known as baid ghanam and in Turkey they are known as koç yumurtası, which in both languages mean 'sheep eggs'.

In some Spanish-speaking countries in Latin America, they are known as criadillas, huevos de toro 'bull eggs'; in Chinese they are known as simplified Chinese: 牛宝; traditional Chinese: 牛寶; pinyin: niú bǎo; lit. 'ox treasures'; in Greek as αμελέτητα 'unmentionables'; in Hindi as kapura; and in Nepali as gula/rajkhani.

The French terms amourettes (from amour, 'love'), animelles or frivolités, the Italian granelli 'granules', and the Spanish and Latin American criadillas 'little maids' began as euphemisms, but have become standard culinary names.

== World variants ==
=== Canada ===
Known as prairie oysters in Canada, they are normally served deep-fried and breaded, with a demi-glace. The dish is especially popular in parts of Canada where cattle ranching is prevalent, and castration of young male animals is common.

=== France ===
Sheep and beef testicles are part of French cuisine. They can be grilled and served à la meunière (with butter, lemon and parsley) and sometimes with white wine and garlic. They are also commonly served breaded and fried.

=== Middle East (Levant) ===
In Jordan and Syria, baid ghanam (or sheep testicles) are grilled and served with lemon juice and parsley.

=== United States ===
In the United States, bull testicles are usually served breaded and deep-fried as an appetizer, under the name Rocky Mountain oysters.

=== Spain ===
==== Spanish ====
Buffalo, boar or bulls' testicles, known as criadillas, are breaded and fried. In tortilla Sacromonte, a speciality from Granada, lambs' brains and testicles are cooked in an omelette.

==== Catalan ====
In Catalan, animal testicles in culinary use and in general are known as turma in the singular, and turmes in the plural. In Catalan, Valencian and Balearic cuisine, lamb, kid, pork or calf testicle dishes were relatively common in the past. They can be cooked breaded and fried, Andalusia style, in a stew, in a rice dish, or in a "sofregit" (sautéed at low heat with onions, a bit of tomato and other vegetables of one's choice), among other options.

=== Japan ===
Whale testicles, called kujira no kougan (鯨の睾丸) or kinsou (キンソウ), are considered a delicacy in Japan and are generally eaten boiled. An extensive number of whale tissues are eaten, which includes the intestines, sex organs, and other offal.

=== Vietnam ===
Bulls' testicles are commonly called ngầu pín. It is a delicacy food influenced by Cantonese cuisine as it is believed to increase men's sexual ability.

=== Mongolia ===
After gelding a colt, the testicles are used for ritual purposes. One of the amputated testicles is punctured with a knife so as to permit the insertion of a rope; the rope is then fastened to the new gelding's tail with the assumption that once the testicle has dried, the wound will have finished healing. The remaining testicle is cooked in the hearth ashes and eaten by the head of the household to acquire the strength of the stallion.

=== United Kingdom ===
Lamb testicles were historically eaten in England where they were referred to as fries or stones. As the name suggests, they were usually fried in butter after being coated in breadcrumbs. However, they are no longer widely eaten and are not available in supermarkets, although they are sold in some Asian and Middle Eastern butchers and other shops.

=== Iran ===
Lamb testicles in Iran are called donbalān (Persian: دنبلان), a white, fleshy mushroom used as a euphemism. Lamb testicles are consumed mostly as home-cooked meals rather than in restaurants as they are considered makrooh (discouraged) according to Islamic laws, but there are restaurants where lamb testicles are available. In Iran, lamb testicles are mainly skewered and grilled; however, in some areas they are shallow-fried and served with bread.

=== India ===
The practice of boiling goat testicles in water and reducing the water with repeated additions of sesame is common in India. Ayurvedic texts describe it as a potent drug among other herbal ayurvedic formulations when discussing treating injury to genital organs. Goat and bull testicles have been consumed prior to the Muslim conquests in India.

Commentaries of the Ashvamedha Yagna, a part of the Rigveda Somayajis tradition, describe consuming horse's entrails including intestines and scrotum along with soma. There is some controversy about the commentaries, particularly related to orgy, and thus authenticity of the practice can be contested.

Goat and cow testicles are highly priced in modern India, up to five times the rung cut/prime cut; however, testicles are not a mainstream delicacy, and are mostly sold as street food. Some tribes offer goat testicles to their guests, such as male lamb genitalia soup, a popular Andhra dish.

== See also ==
- Hasma
- Milt
- Offal
- Rocky Mountain oysters
- Soup Number Five
- Testicle Festival
