= Penis as food =

Bull penis served at the Kenka restaurant in New York City

Penis or pizzle is a type of offal. In many cultures, it is a taboo food. Penis is eaten in some cultures or traditional medicine systems as a purported health food: it may be seen as an aphrodisiac, a cure for sexual dysfunction, a hangover cure, and more. Penis is often paired with testicles as food.

== Description and production ==
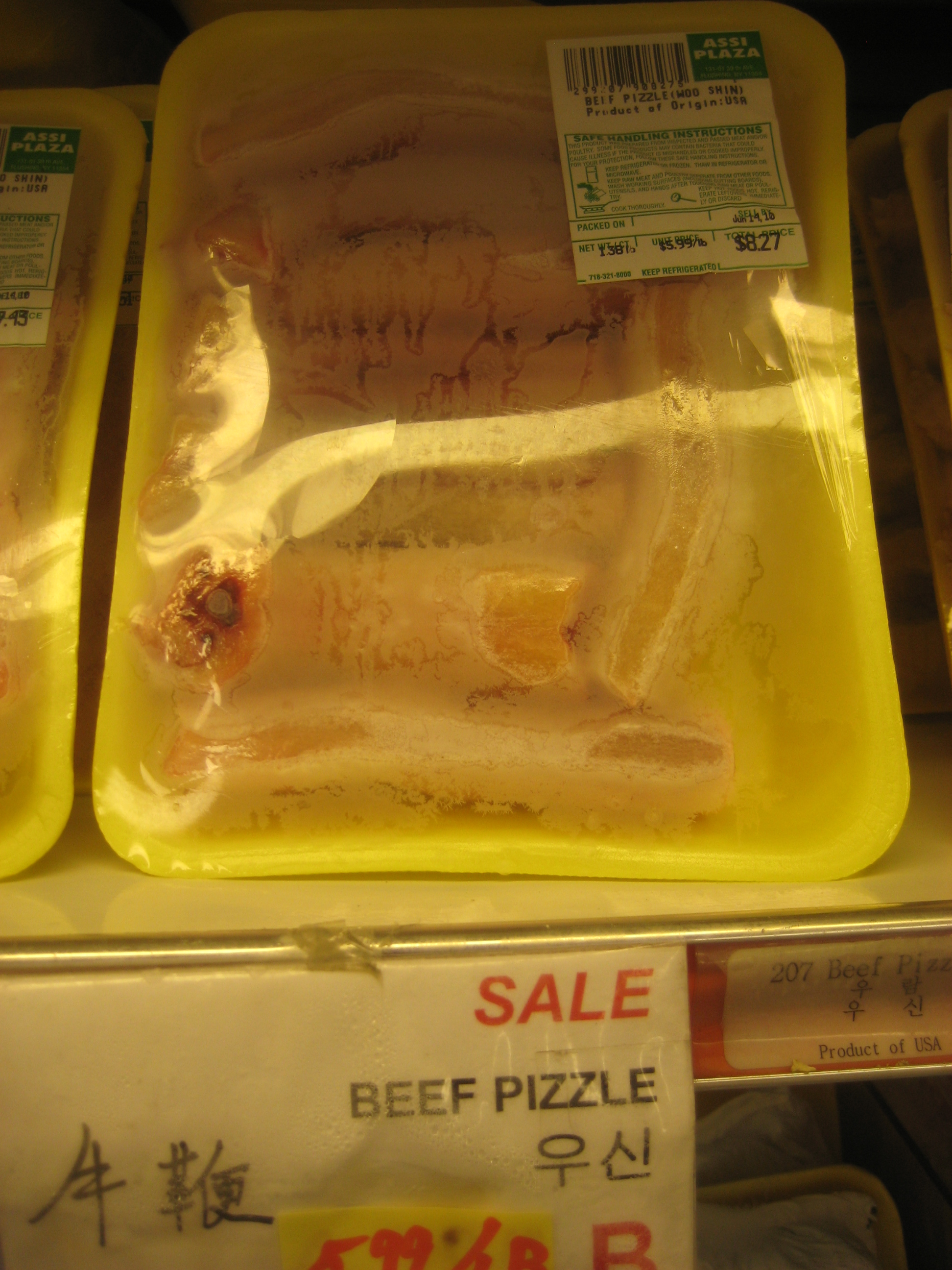
Packaged bull pizzle

Penis is by majority collagen, so it typically has a gelatinous texture.

The penis is typically a byproduct in the meat industry. A penis has to be removed with care, as there is risk of rupturing the bladder or urethra and contaminating the carcass with urine.

== Consumption by region ==
Penis is a taboo food in many cultures, even those that consume copious offal; anthropologist Robert Rotenberg opines that the symbolic association of penis to coitus, urination and ejaculation makes consuming it off-putting. Even in areas where penis is consumed, it is typically a niche food and eaten under specific circumstances, such as when their purported health benefits are needed.

=== Americas ===
==== Bolivia ====
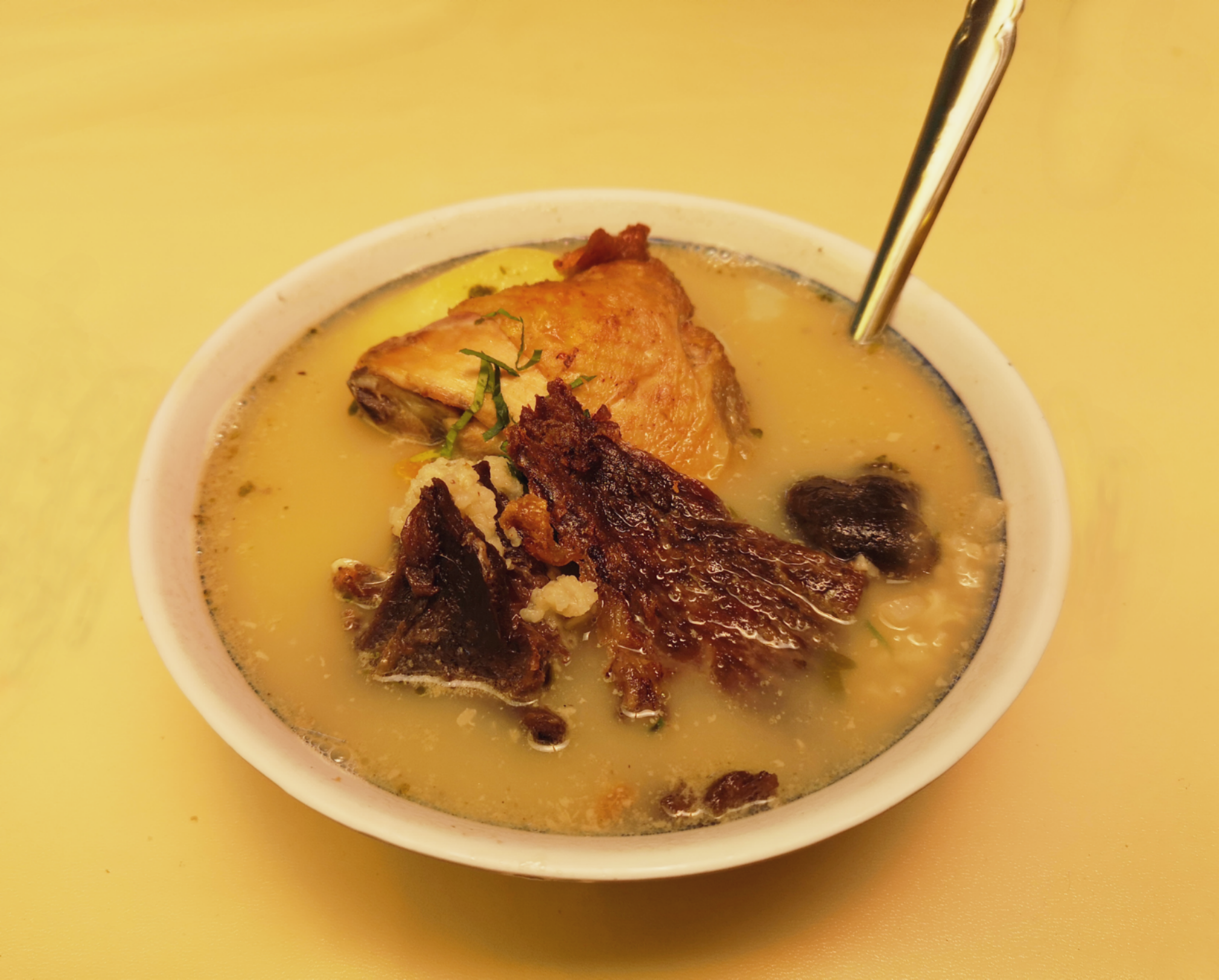
Caldo de cardán

Caldo de cardán (lit. 'driveshaft broth'), known by the moniker "The Viagra of the Andes", is a Bolivian cuisine bull penis and testicle soup. A speciality of El Alto and La Paz, the soup is eaten for its perceived benefits as a stimulant, aphrodisiac and hangover cure, and for pain relief. Caldo de cardán typically features many other meats, such as beef tendon, ribs, and ch'arki, as well as hardboiled eggs, potatoes, rice, onions and llajua. The soup is simmered for over ten hours and typically served on weekends, particularly Sunday morning, at a high temperature.

==== Colombia ====
Caldo de raíz (lit. 'root soup') or caldo peligroso (lit. 'dangerous broth') is a Colombian cuisine bull penis and testicles soup. The soup is cooked for hours with potatoes, peas, and occasionally beans. Caldo de raíz is eaten as an aphrodisiac.

==== Ecuador ====
Caldo de tronquito is an Ecuadoran cuisine bull penis soup. The soup features grains like hominy and corn, beans like chickpeas and fava beans, and offal like tripe and testicles; the ingredients are comparable to a fanesca with meat. Regional variations include Manabí, where peanuts and milk are added, and La Costa, which favors corn, cassava and carrots. The soup is eaten as a hangover cure, to treat anemia, assist recovery from sickness or post-partum, and as an aphrodisiac.

Caldo de tronquito was created in 16th century Quito after the Spanish colonization of Ecuador introduced cattle to the continent.

==== El Salvador ====
"Triple saldo" is a Salvadorean cuisine bull penis and testicles soup. The soup is simmered for eight hours, with crema and eggs of free-range chickens added at the end. Triple saldo is eaten as an aphrodisiac.

Bull penis and testicle tacos (tacos de viril) are becoming popular in Ahuachapán.

==== Jamaica ====
"Cow cod soup" is a traditional, rustic dish in Jamaican cuisine that is considered an aphrodisiac and made with bull penis ("cod"). It is traditionally cooked with bananas and Scotch bonnet peppers in a white rum-based broth.

==== Mexico ====
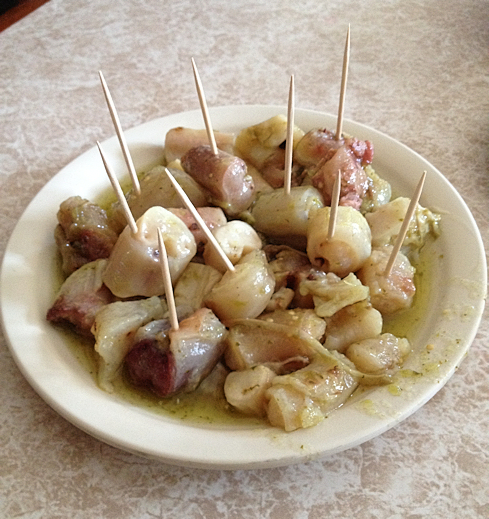
Viril de toro, Oaxaca, Mexico

Viril de toro is a traditional Mexican cantina food prepared by boiling bull pizzle in vinegar, slicing it into pieces, and serving with toothpicks. It may be eaten as a display of machismo.

=== Africa ===
Lasopy soucril (French: zizi de zebu) is a zebu penis soup in Malagasy cuisine. It is seen as an aphrodisiac and a treatment for infertility and erectile dysfunction. The penis is soaked and par-boiled to remove any remaining urine, then boiled with vegetables for several hours. Lasopy soucril is served at a high temperature with pepper and chilies.

=== Asia ===
==== China ====
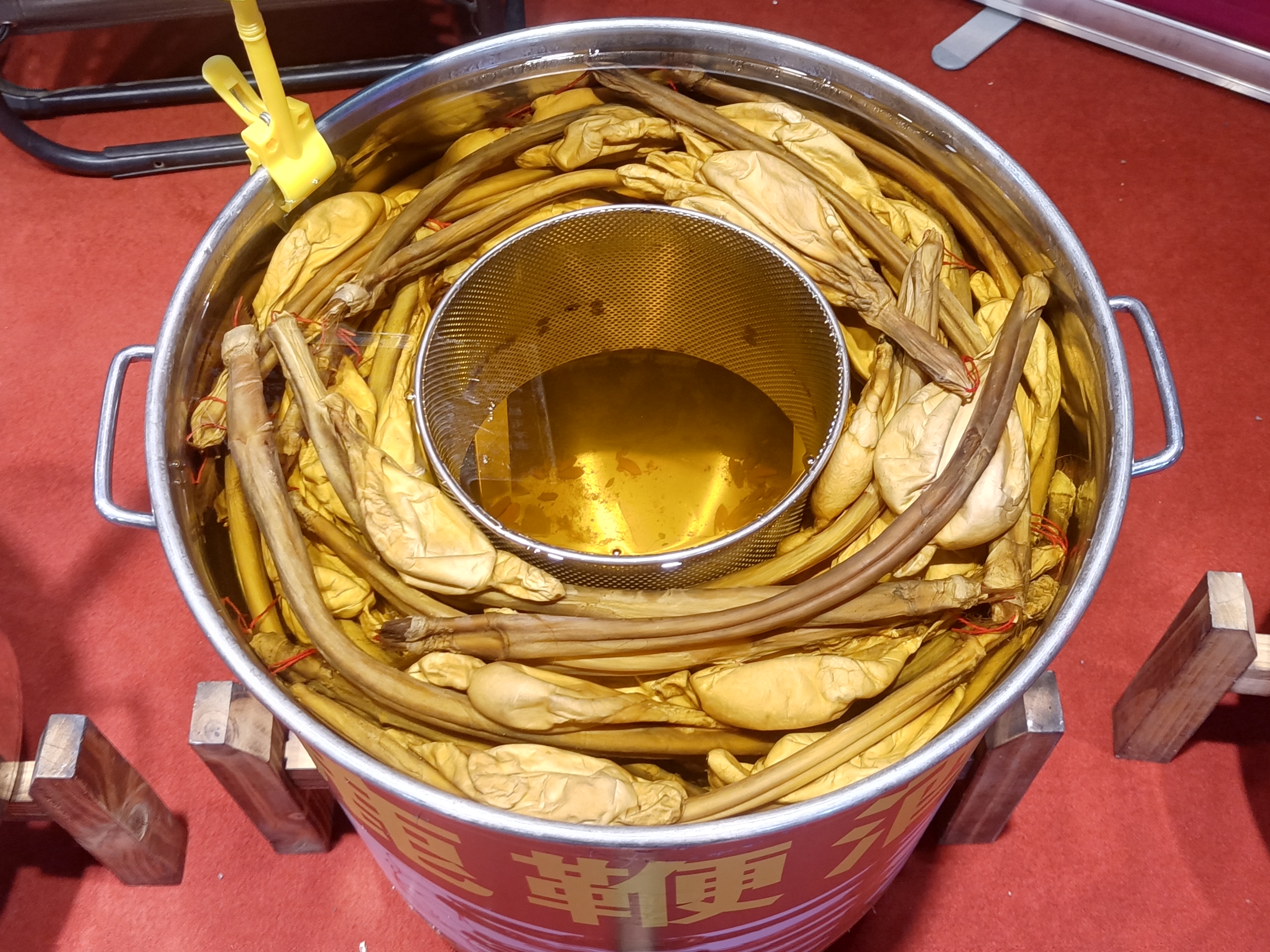
Deer penis and testicle infusing in rice wine

In China, although scientifically unsubstantiated, penis is eaten in traditional Chinese medicine to treat erectile dysfunction. An example dish is tiger penis soup, consumed as an aphrodisiac or to treat sexual disfunction.

Chongqing penis stew is a delicacy of Chongqing, featuring Sichuan pepper.

Guo Li Zhuang is a Chinese cuisine restaurant that specializes in penis dishes. The restaurant features table-side traditional Chinese medicine nutritionists that recommend dishes based on diners' ailments; penises offered include dog, goat, deer, bull, ox, yak, sheep, horse, donkey, and seal. The restaurant has expanded from America to China, with multiple locations in the Beijing area.

==== Malaysia ====
Sup torpedo (lit. 'torpedo soup'; also sup hameed) is a Malaysian Indian cuisine bull penis curry soup, a delicacy of mamak stalls typically served with roti benggali. The soup is typically eaten as an aphrodisiac; variations include sup torpedo campur, which includes goat's testicles and horse penis. The Mufti of Federal Territory's Office opines that eating sup torpedo, although halal, is makruh for being genital meat.

==== Philippines ====
"Soup Number Five" (also Soup No. 5, Soup #5) is a Filipino soup made from bull's testes or penis. It is believed to have aphrodisiac properties. Cebu's variant of Soup Number Five is called lansiao (also lanciao; from Chinese: 𡳞鳥; Pe̍h-ōe-jī: lǎn-chiáu, penis) from Philippine Hokkien. Soup Number Five is popularly known as "Remember Me" ("RM") in Cagayan de Oro in Mindanao, supplanting its other names in the northern regions of the Philippines.

==== Vietnam ====
Phở ngẩu pín

Phở in Vietnamese cuisine includes many variations, including the addition of penis (ngẩu pín, lit. 'bull's penis', but also used generally). In Vietnamese street food, penis is skewered and grilled; popular varieties include bull, buffalo, goat, dog, and deer.

== See also ==
- Milt
- Testicles as food
- Uni
