= Deer penis =

Traditional Chinese medicine

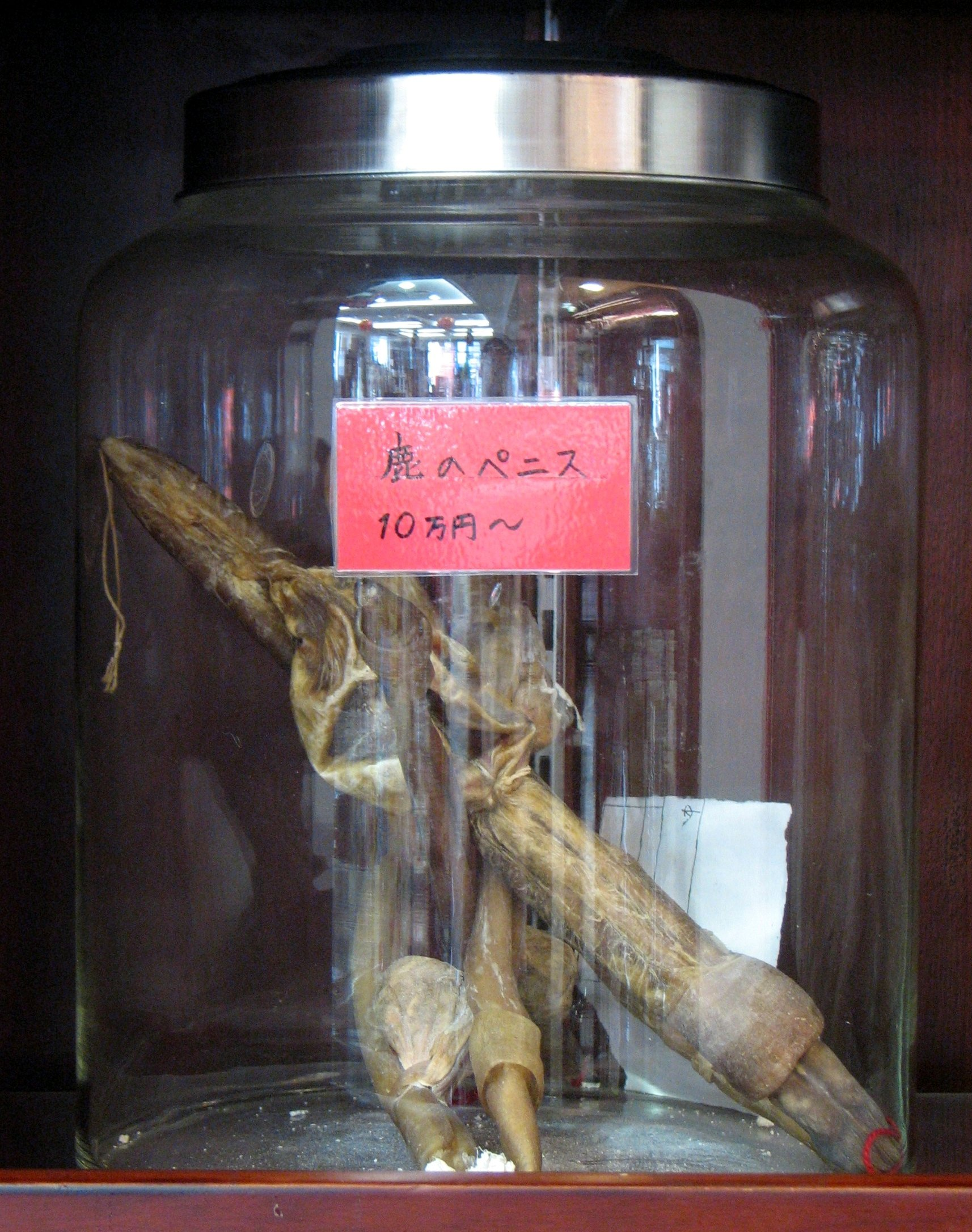
Deer penis in a Chinese pharmacy in Yokohama, Japan for ¥100,000 ($859.85).

In traditional Chinese medicine, a deer penis (Chinese: 鹿鞭; pinyin: lù biān; Vietnamese: Lộc pín) is said to have important therapeutic properties.

== Purported properties ==
In Nangang, Taiwan, women are reported to consume deer penis during pregnancy as it is said to have a fattening effect and to make the mother and child stronger.

The Mayans were also known to extract the penis of the deer and roast it.

During the 2008 Summer Olympics in China, the country banned deer penis wine, turtle blood and angelica root supplements from athletes' diets. This is because according to traditional Chinese medicine, deer penis, especially if ingested while soaked in alcohol (deer penis wine), is an effective remedy for athletic injuries. Chinese Olympic officials advised national athletes not to take the traditional remedy because it may contain the banned herb Ephedra. It joined steroids and various stimulants on the list of banned substances. When consumed, a deer penis or tiger penis is also said to enhance strength, and is thought by some to be an aphrodisiac.

== Availability ==
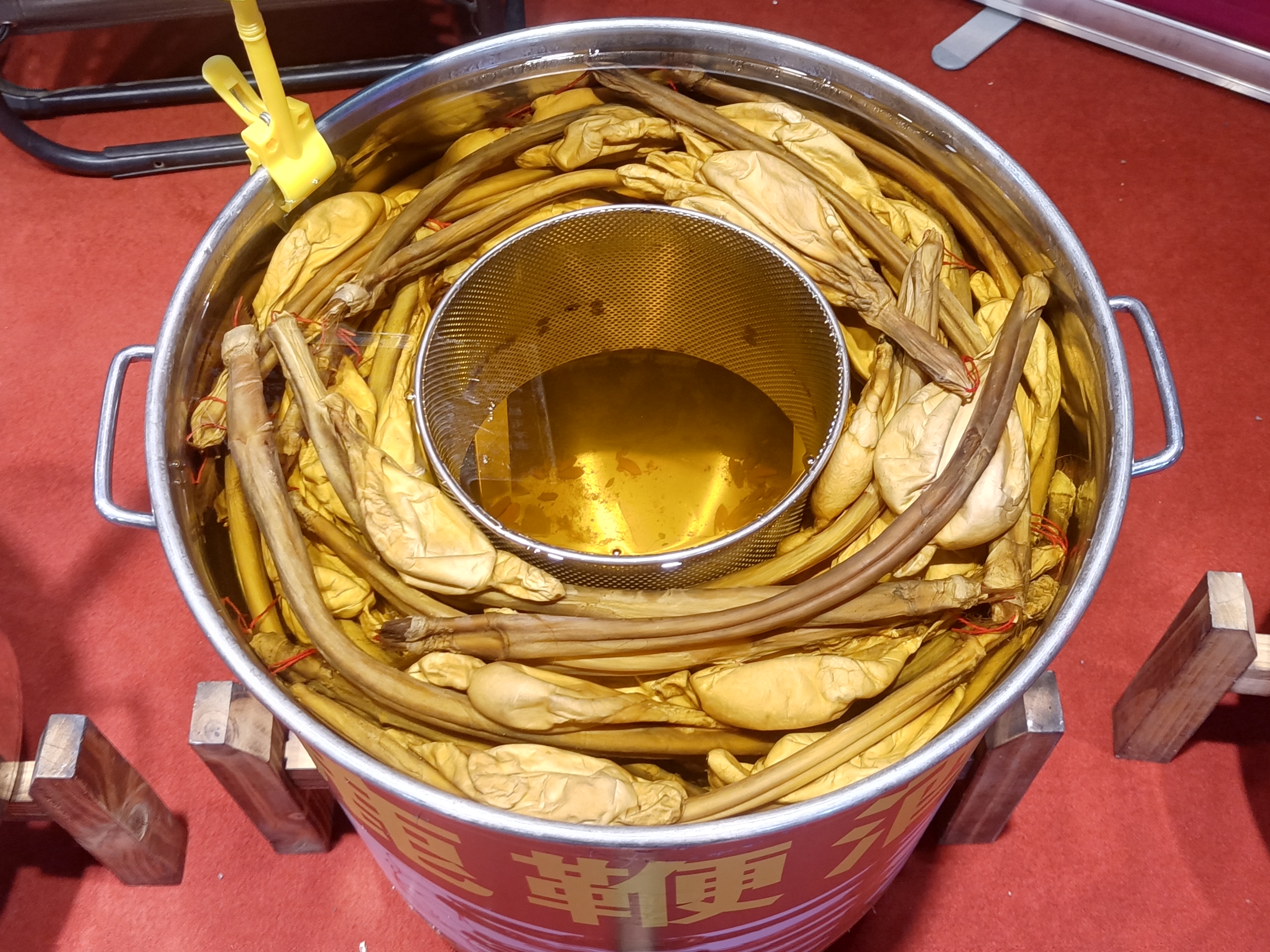
Deer penis wine (Chinese: 鹿鞭酒; pinyin: lù biān jiǔ) can be obtained by soaking the deer penis in yellow wine.

Like turtle's blood and penis, deer penis is one of the "delicacies" served in large jars in Snake Alley, Taipei. It is also served in mainland China in restaurants such as the Guo Li Zhuang. Deer penis wine can be sold at $12 a glass and often as high as $455 for a two-litre bottle. Deer-antler wine, known as Lurongjiu, is also said to enhance sexual potency in men and to have a warming effect, aiding the joints. A deer's penis, turtle's penis, or bull's penis is consumed in restaurants and is known in Singapore to be offered as a soup delicacy.

== Popular culture ==
Powdered deer penis is mentioned in the 1996 Steven Seagal film The Glimmer Man, during the scene where Seagal and Keenen Ivory Wayans enter a Chinese herbal store.

Weebam-Na, a miscellaneous character in The Elder Scrolls IV: Oblivion, mentions powdered deer penis when asked about Leyawiin, the city he resides in.

Deer penis is mentioned in the 2009 episode of The Office "Double Date" when Dwight corrects Michael's statement calling fish sticks an aphrodisiac: "You're thinking of deer penis", Dwight replies.

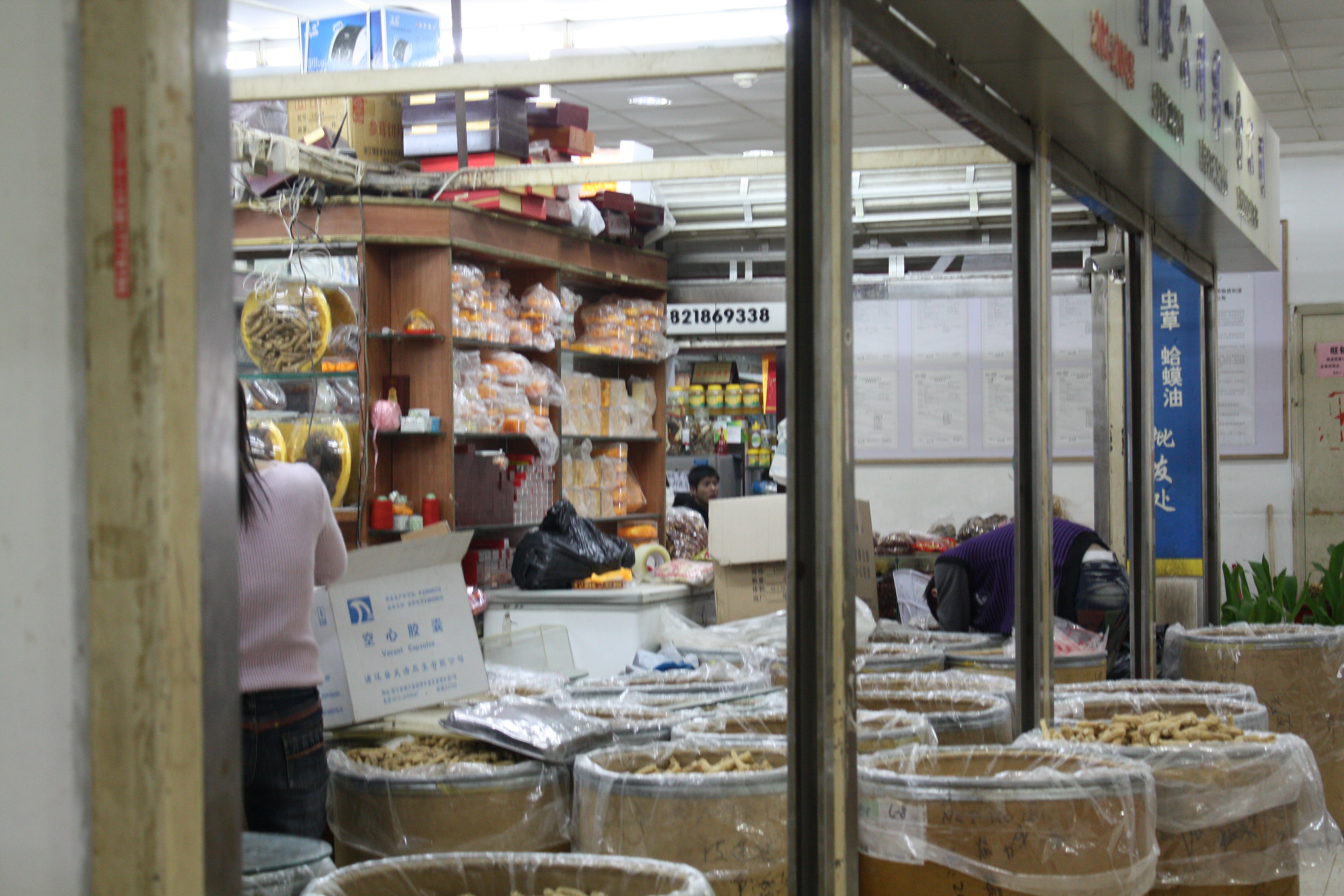
A health store in Shanghai that retails deer penis and other medicinals

In Season 1, Episode 5 of The League, Ruxin and Taco go to Chinatown to buy "3 Penis Wine", involving the infusion of deer penises, dog penises and snake penises. However, the real "Three-Penis Wine" contains a fusion of seal, dog and deer penis.

In 2025, Russian band Elektroslabost (Russian: Электрослабость, lit. 'Electroweakness') recorded and released the song "Oleniy penis" (Russian: Олений пенис, lit. 'Deer penis'). The ironic track features the deer penis as a magical talisman that grants supernatural "powers" to a psychic. The song serves as a satire on the tropes of Russian television, particularly parodying the popular supernatural show The Battle of Psychics (Russian: Битва Экстрасенсов) and its portrayal of esoteric practices. Due to its absurdist humor, the song quickly became a meme in the Russian-speaking segment of the Internet, spreading through social media platforms and generating numerous user-created memes and remixes.

== See also ==
- Penis
- Elk self-anointing
- Sexual behavior of deer
- Pizzle
- Koro (medicine)
- Tiger penis
- Elephant penis

== Bibliography ==
- Pérez, William, Noelia Vazquez, and Rodolfo Ungerfeld. "Gross anatomy of the male genital organs of the pampas deer (Ozotoceros bezoarticus, Linnaeus 1758)." Anatomical science international 88.3 (2013): 123–129.
- Stewart, David W. "Letters to the Editor: Male Genitalia of Red Deer (Cer Vus Elaphus)." New Zealand veterinary journal 31.7 (1983): 122-122.
- Geist, Valerius (January 1998). Deer of the World: Their Evolution, Behaviour, and Ecology. Stackpole Books. ISBN 978-0-8117-0496-0.
- Mesang-Nalley, Marlene, Henderiana Belli, and Ristika Handarini. "Anatomy and Morphometry of Timor Deer (Cervus timorensis) Stags Reproductive Organs."
- Yueqiu, Guo, et al. "Identification of Deer Testes and Penis and its Counterfeiting Products by Immuno-agglutination Testing." CHINESE PHARMACEUTICAL AFFAIRS 2 (2000): 017.
- Vidyadaran, M. K., et al. "Male genital organs and accessory glands of the lesser mouse deer, Tragulus javanicus." Journal of mammalogy (1999): 199–204.
- Stewart, D. W. (1983). "Letters to the Editor". New Zealand Veterinary Journal. 31 (7): 122. doi:10.1080/00480169.1983.34991. PMID 16030982.
- Marburger, R. G., R. M. Robinson, and J. W. Thomas. "Genital hypoplasia of white-tailed deer." Journal of Mammalogy 48.4 (1967): 674–676.
- Kennaugh, J. H.; Chapman, D. I.; Chapman, N. G. (2009). "Seasonal changes in the prepuce of adult Fallow deer (Dama dama) and its probable function as a scent organ". Journal of Zoology. 183 (3): 301. doi:10.1111/j.1469-7998.1977.tb04189.x.
- Bonnard, Marc (1999). The Viagra Alternative: The Complete Guide to Overcoming Erectile Dysfunction Naturally. Inner Traditions / Bear & Company. ISBN 978-0-89281-789-4.
- Balcombe, Jonathan (2 May 2006). Pleasurable Kingdom: Animals and the Nature of Feeling Good. Palgrave Macmillan. ISBN 978-0-230-55227-2.
- Leonard Lee Rue III; Leonard Lee Rue, III (1 November 2004). The Deer of North America: The Standard Reference on All North American Deer Species--Behavior, Habitat, Distribution, and More. LYONS Press. ISBN 978-1-59228-465-8.
- Youngquist, Robert S.; Threlfall, Walter R. (23 November 2006). Current Therapy in Large Animal Theriogenology. Elsevier Health Sciences. ISBN 978-1-4377-1340-4.
- Glover, Tim (30 June 2012). Mating Males: An Evolutionary Perspective on Mammalian Reproduction. Cambridge University Press. ISBN 978-1-107-00001-8.
- Elizabeth Marshall Thomas (15 September 2009). The Hidden Life of Deer. HarperCollins. pp. 237–. ISBN 978-0-06-190209-3.
- Feldhamer, George A.; McShea, William J. (26 January 2012). Deer: The Animal Answer Guide. JHU Press. pp. 72–. ISBN 978-1-4214-0387-8.
- Stefoff, Rebecca (30 November 2007). Deer. Marshall Cavendish. pp. 24–. ISBN 978-0-7614-2534-2.
- Walter Penn Taylor (1961). The Deer of North America: The White-tailed, Mule and Black-tailed Deer, Genus Odocoileus, Their History and Management. Stackpole Company.
