= Pizzle =

Penis of an animal

Pizzle is a Middle English word for penis, derived from Low German pesel or Flemish Dutch pezel, diminutive of the Dutch language pees, meaning 'sinew'. The word is used today to signify the penis of an animal, chiefly in Australia and New Zealand.

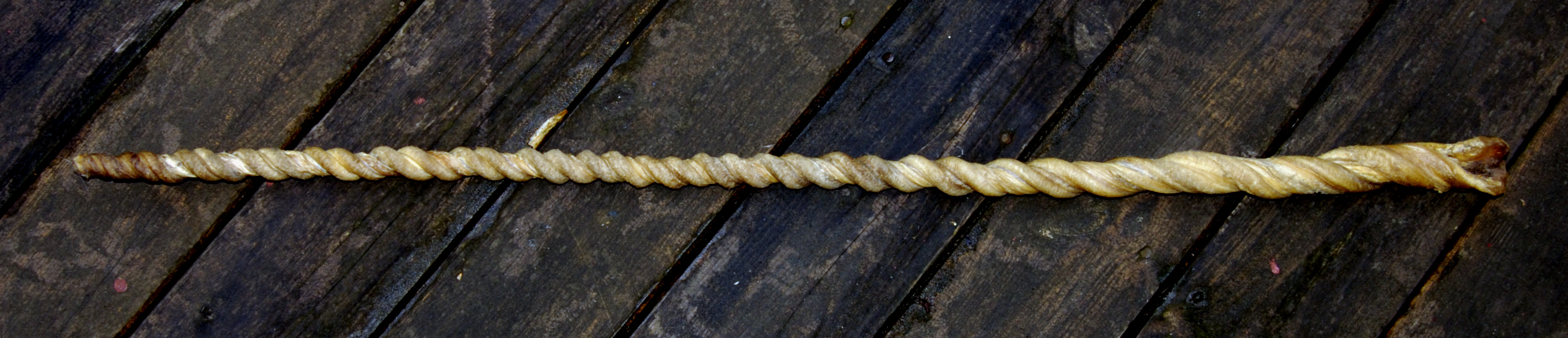
Dried bull pizzle

The word pizzle is also known, at least since 1523, especially in the combination "bull pizzle", to denote a flogging instrument made from a bull's penis.

In William Shakespeare's play Henry IV, Part 1, the character Falstaff uses the term as an insult (Act 2, Scene IV):

'Sblood, you starveling, you elf-skin, you dried neat's tongue, you bull's pizzle, you stock-fish!

== In heraldry ==
In heraldry, the term pizzled (or vilené in French blazon) indicates the depiction or inclusion of an animate charge's genitalia, especially if colored (or "tinctured") differently.

Coat of arms of Appenzell, Switzerland; argent, a bear rampant sable armed, langued and pizzled gules

The bear in the coat of arms of Appenzell is represented pizzled, and omission of this feature was seen as a grave insult. In 1579, the pizzle was forgotten by the printer of a calendar printed in Saint Gallen, which brought Appenzell to the brink of war with Saint Gallen.

In 2007, commander Karl Engelbrektson decided that the lion's penis in the coat of arms of the Nordic Battlegroup had to be removed. Contrary to initial media reports that the decision was taken following complaints from female soldiers, Engelbrektson revealed in a February 2008 interview with Sveriges Radio that it was he who made the decision, based on the 2000 United Nations Security Council Resolution 1325 on women, peace, and security. Since civilian women are often sexually assaulted in the war zones of the world, the commander did not consider the depiction of a penis appropriate on a uniform worn into battle.

The decision was questioned by some Swedish heraldists, with Vladimir Sagerlund asserting that coats of arms containing lions without a penis were historically given to those who had betrayed the Swedish Crown. The state heraldist Henrik Klackenberg complained that his heraldry unit should have been consulted before making such change, but did not intend to take legal action.

== Modern uses ==
=== Paramilitary use in World War II ===
Pizzles were widely used (as whips) as late as 1944 by local paramilitary units on the Eastern Front, usually as a disciplinary measure against arrested or bullied civilians.

=== Animal consumption ===
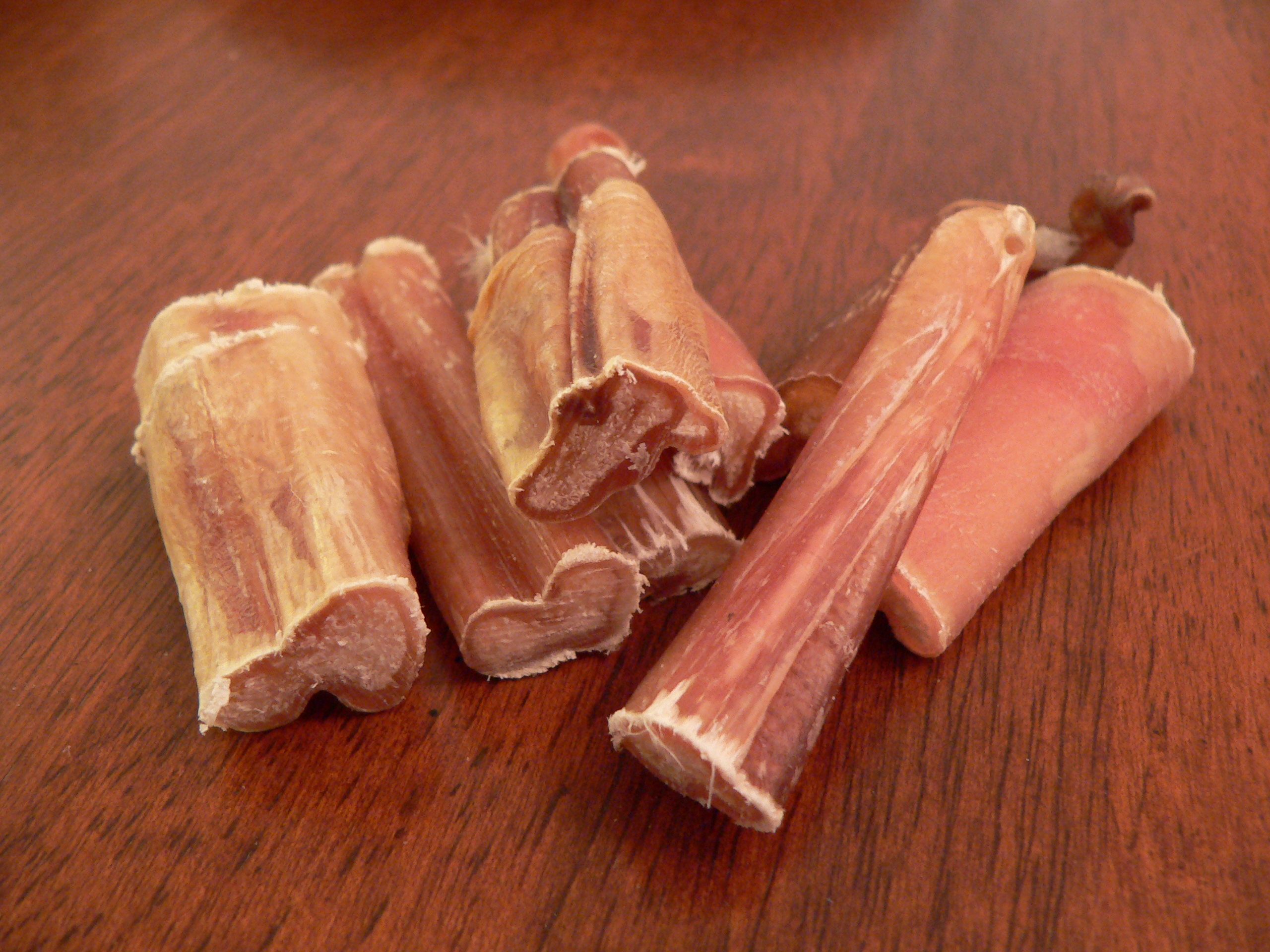
Bull pizzle cut into small pieces for dogs to chew

A dog chewing on a pizzle

Pizzles, or bully sticks, are mostly produced today as chewing treats for dogs. Bull penises are dried, in open air or in ovens. Commercial vendors will drain the blood and urine from the organ prior to drying in order to decrease the smell of these when chewed by dogs. These are called "odor free" bully sticks. "Junior" bully sticks are thinner ones that are made from castrated males (steer).

=== Glue ===
The pizzle of bull was commonly rendered for use as glue between the 1940s and the 1960s.

=== Human consumption ===
In addition to being used as a dog treat, pizzles are also eaten by humans for their purported health benefits (according to traditional Chinese medicine) such as being low in cholesterol and high in protein, hormones, and vitamins, and minerals such as calcium and magnesium, although little empirical evidence supports these claims. Pizzles for human consumption are prepared either by freezing or by drying.

Scottish deer pizzles are thought to boost stamina and were used by Chinese athletes at the 2008 Summer Olympics. Pizzles can be served in soup, and if they have been dried they can be turned into a paste. Pizzles may also be mixed with alcoholic beverages or simply thawed (if frozen) and eaten. In Jamaica, bull pizzles are referred to as "cow cods" and are eaten as cow cod soup. Like many animal penis- or testicle-based foods, cow cod soup is claimed to be an aphrodisiac and to be able to boost muscle strength.

=== Canes ===
A man holding a pizzle cane

A semi-novelty use for bull's pizzles is in the manufacture of walking sticks. They are reinforced with a metal rod down the center, cured by a taxidermist until fully dried, lacquered, then fitted with a handle and ferrule, closely resembling wood when finished. Though mostly produced from domestic cattle, pizzles from bison are also sometimes used. The use of pizzles as canes dates back as far as Ancient Egypt, and, more recently, personages such as Doc Holliday, Bat Masterson, and Jack Dempsey owned pizzle canes.
