= Amy Reiley =

American food writer

Amy Reiley is an American author of aphrodisiac cookbooks Fork Me, Spoon Me and Chile Aphrodisia, culinary journalist and owner of food and wine publishing and consulting company Life of Reiley.

She has been called "one of the foremost educated women in food and wine" by Just Cause and Playboy magazine.

== Background ==
Reiley attended Le Cordon Bleu, France's culinary temple. In 2004, she became the second American to be named a Master of Gastronomy by Cordon Bleu. During her tenure at the culinary institute, Reiley became known for her work in culinary aphrodisiacs. Since that time, she has become the premier culinary authority on aphrodisiac foods for inspiring romantic experiences and sexual pleasure.

Life of Reiley began with a free food in wine newsletter in 2002, and has since grown into a publishing, food and wine research, consulting and speaking venture. Life of Reiley offers information on food and romance, wine and romance, aphrodisiac cooking and dining and fun food or wine diversions for events, groups and publications.

In 2005, Reiley was singled out as one of the five best female wine professionals in the world of the year by France's Wine Women awards.

Reiley was born in Somerset, PA and currently resides part of the time in Las Vegas and part of the time in Los Angeles. She designed a culinary classroom and test kitchen in Los Angeles, where culinary experts can hold classes, tasting events and film and television shoots.

In January 2009, Reiley was featured in an article discussing ten questions about aphrodisiacs in the fine beverage publication, Mutineer magazine.

== Published works ==
Amy Reiley’s Pocket Vineyard was created in 1999 and became the first comprehensive wine program for PDAs. In 2001, she launched the companion program, Amy Reiley’s Pocket Gourmet. Both were named “must have” PDA programs by Worth Magazine in 2002.

In January 2006, Reiley published Fork Me, Spoon Me: The sensual cookbook through Life of Reiley. The cookbook celebrates the power to cook up passion with recipes with natural aphrodisiac ingredients, including almonds, vanilla, rosemary, mint, chocolate, chile, ginger, mango, peaches, saffron, honey and figs. In this cookbook and many interviews, Reiley asserts that cheese is a better aphrodisiac than the widely believed chocolate. She states that cheese contains approximately ten times a much serotonin and phenyl ethylamine [PEA], which can give a hormone rush that feels like the rush of intercourse.

Chile Aphrodisiac written by Reiley and Annette Tomei, was published in June 2006 by Rio Nuevo Press. The cookbook is lauded as a sensual celebration of colorful, contrasting flavors.

Reiley is also an internationally known journalist, providing food and wine articles for several publications, including Variety, Gault Millau, Daily Candy and Las Vegas Magazine. Her column, “Woman on Wine,” has been syndicated to numerous publications throughout the world.

Reiley still publishes her monthly newsletter, now called Aphrodisiac of the Month. The newsletter is free and provides information highlighting the aphrodisiac history and science of one notable ingredient each month.

Reiley believes that culinary aphrodisiacs are like vitamins: “Aphrodisiac foods have nutritive properties that are beneficial to your sexual health.”

== Other works ==
Reiley also created and manages Eat Something Sexy, an informational website that provides recipes, recent news, advice and information on cooking, wine and spirits and romantic travel. Contributors to the website are professional journalists and tastemakers from around the world. The website also contains an aphrodisiac dictionary, lauded as the largest sources of aphrodisiac food history and science on the web.

Reiley speaks about culinary aphrodisiacs at numerous events, including corporate retreats, bridal showers, reunions, conventions, holiday parties and fundraisers. She provides tips on pairing food and wines and creating the romantic environments. She also instructs men and women on how to set the mood and enhance sensual pleasures.

== Charity work ==
Reiley is the Los Angeles Regional Volunteer Director for the non-profit organization, Rock and Wrap It Up, which provides food to homeless shelters. The organization contracts with musical artists, sports teams, schools and colleges to pick up surplus food remaining after parties and events, then deliver that food to nearby homeless shelters. Reiley became involved with Rock and Wrap It Up in 1999, helping to organize volunteers to obtain food and frequently going on deliveries.

== Awards and recognitions ==
Master of Gastronomy – Reiley earned her Master of Arts in Gastronomy from Le Cordon Bleu. When she received the title in 2004, she was the second American to receive the honor.

Wine Women Awards – In 2005, named one of the five best female wine professionals in the world, by France's Wine Women Awards.

== Bibliography ==
- Amy Reiley’s Pocket Vineyard (1999)
- Amy Reiley’s Pocket Gourmet (2001)
- Fork Me, Spoon Me (2006)
- Chile Aphrodisiac (2006)
- The Love Diet (2010)
- Romancing the Stove (2012)
- Eat Cake Naked (2018)

== See also ==
- Aphrodisiac
