= Self-anointing in animals =

Behaviour whereby a non-human animal smears odoriferous substances over itself

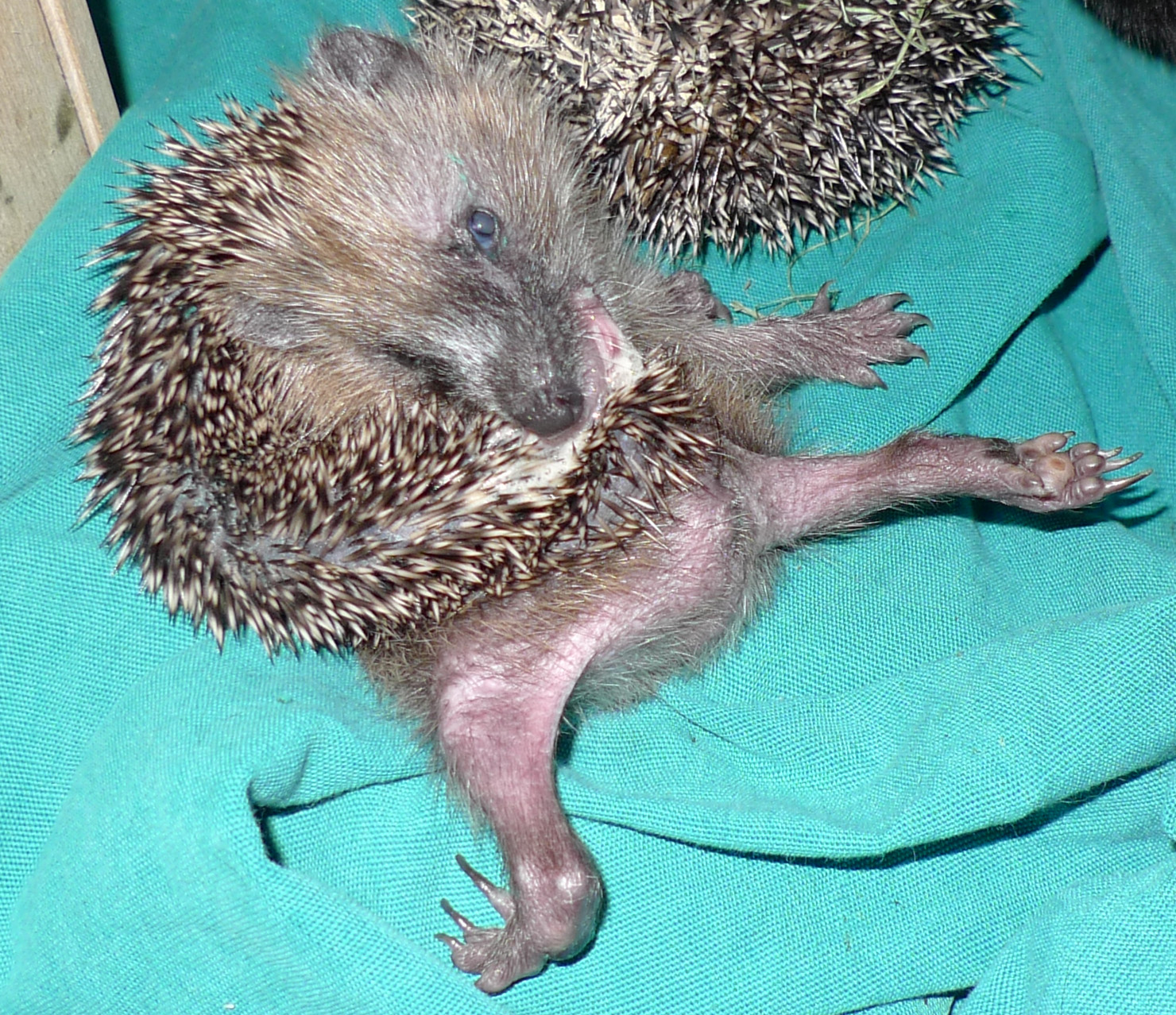
A hedgehog self-anointing

Self-anointing in animals, sometimes called anointing or anting, is a behaviour whereby a non-human animal smears odoriferous substances over itself. These substances are often the secretions, parts, or entire bodies of other animals or plants. The animal may chew these substances and then spread the resulting saliva mixture over their body, or they may apply the source of the odour directly with an appendage, tool or by rubbing their body on the source.

The functions of self-anointing differ between species, but it may act as self-medication, repel parasites, provide camouflage, aid in communication, or make the animal poisonous.

== Primates ==
Several primate species self-anoint with various items such as millipedes, leaves and fruit. They sometimes drool while doing this. Both capuchin monkeys and squirrel monkeys perform urine washing, when they deposit a small quantity of urine onto the palm of a hand and then rub it on the sole of the opposite foot. It is thought to have multiple functions including hygiene, thermoregulation and response to irritation from biting ectoparasites (such as ticks and botfly). Some strepsirrhines and New World monkeys also self-anoint the body with urine to communicate.

=== Capuchins ===
Wild wedge-capped capuchin monkeys (Cebus olivaceus) self-anoint with millipedes (Orthoporus dorsovittatus). Chemical analysis revealed these millipedes secrete two benzoquinones, compounds known to be potently repellent to insects and the secretions are thought to provide protection against insects, particularly mosquitoes (and the bot flies they transmit) during the rainy season. Millipede secretion is so avidly sought by the monkeys that up to four of them will share a single millipede. The anointment must also involve risks, since benzoquinones are toxic and carcinogenic; however, it is likely that for capuchins, the immediate benefits of self-anointment outweigh the long-term costs. Secretions from these millipedes also elicit self-anointing in captive male and female tufted capuchin (C. apella) and white-faced capuchin (C. capucinus) monkeys.

Wild Cebus anoint more with plant parts, including fruits, whereas wild Sapajus anoint more with ants and other arthropods. White-faced capuchins in particular use more plant species at each site for anointing compared with other capuchins and may specialize in anointing as an activity independent from foraging, whereas most other capuchin species tend to eat the substances they use for anointing. Wild Cebus anoint at a higher frequency than Sapajus as occurs in captive groups. However, contrary data from captive animals there no difference in the range of sociality for anointing between Cebus and Sapajus in the wild.

Capuchin monkeys at the Edinburgh Zoo rub onions and limes on their skin and into their fur as an antiseptic and insect repellent.

White-faced capuchin monkeys sometimes anoint their bodies with mud and plant matter, a natural insect repellent. With their heads and faces slathered in this mixture, these highly social primates lose their ability to recognise each other and previously friendly monkeys can become fighting foes.

=== Spider monkeys ===
Mexican spider monkeys (Ateles geoffroyi) self-anoint with the leaves of three species of plants; the Alamos pea tree (Brongniartia alamosana), the trumpet tree (Cecropia obtusifolia) and wild celery (Apium graveolens). In one study, only two males in a group of 10 individuals displayed self-anointing. Only the sternal and axillary regions of the body were rubbed with the mix of saliva and plant material. There was a lack of correlation between the occurrence of self-anointing and time of day, season of the year, ambient temperature or humidity, indicating that this behaviour does not function in repelling insects and/or mitigating topical skin infections in this species. Rather, the three plant species spread an intensive and aromatic odour when crushed, indicating that self-anointing in Mexican spider monkeys may play a role in the context of social communication, possibly for signalling of social status or to increase sexual attractiveness.

=== Lemurs ===
Male ring-tailed lemurs have scent glands on their wrists, chests, and in the genital area. During encounters with rival males they may perform ritualised aggression by having a "stink fight". The males anoint their tails by rubbing the ends of their tails on the inside of their wrists and on their chests. They then arch their tails over their bodies and wave them at their opponent. The male toward which this is directed either responds with a display of his own, physical aggression, or flees. "Stink fights" can last from 10 minutes to one hour.

Black lemurs have also been observed self-anointing with millipedes.

== Ungulates ==
An elk anointing himself with urine

Several ungulates self-anoint by spraying urine onto their own bodies or onto the ground or into a wallow before rubbing themselves onto the substrate.

In Nile lechwe, a unique form of marking is seen with the start of mating. The male bends his head to the ground and urinates on his throat and cheek hair. He then rubs his dripping beard on the female's forehead and rump.

=== Deer ===
Unlike other deer species, chital do not spray urine on their bodies. Instead, male chital mark their territory by dripping urine in scrapes, and then pawing them.

Sambar stags will wallow and dig their antlers in urine soaked soil and then rub against tree trunks. A stag will also mark himself by spraying urine directly in the face with a highly mobile penis, which is often erect during rutting activities. Similar urine-spraying behavior is common in other deer species, and is known as automarking.

White-tailed doe rub-urinating

Throughout the year white-tailed deer will rub-urinate, a process during which a deer squats while urinating so that urine will run down the insides of the deer's legs, over the tarsal glands, and onto the hair covering these glands. Bucks rub-urinate more frequently during the breeding season.

==== Elk ====
A self-anointing male elk

Bull elk often dig holes in the ground, in which they urinate and roll their body. The urine soaks into their hair and gives them a distinct smell which attracts cows. Some deer species, including elk, can mark themselves by spraying urine on their bodies from an erect penis. One type of scent-marking behavior in elk is known as "thrash-urination, which typically involves palpitation of the erect penis. A male elk's urethra points upward so that urine is sprayed almost at a right angle to the penis.

When urine marking, the male elk advertises this with a specialised vocalisation called the "bugle". During the last phase of the bugle, the bull rubs (palpates) his belly in rhythm with "yelps". He then directs a spray of urine towards his stomach or the ground. The hair on his stomach in front of the penis becomes soaked with urine and gains a dark brown tint.

Urine spraying is a variable behaviour. It may consist of simply dribbling a few drops of urine, or, large rhythmic discharges from an erect penis. A stream may be aimed at the mane on the neck, or, a fine mist might be sprayed against the stomach. The bull usually rub/palpates during this process. The urine can be voided almost at right angles to the erect penis. When a large volume of urine is sprayed, it usually takes place at a wallow. When urine spraying, the bull lowers his head towards the ground. In this position, his mane becomes soaked as he sprays urine forwards, between his legs. Once the wallow has been created, the male elk lowers himself into the area, rolls on his side and rub his mane on the soaked area of the wallow. He rubs the side of his face, his chest, stomach, legs, and flanks, which all become caked with mud. During wallowing, the elk's penis may remain erect and he may continue to spray urine.

==== Red deer ====
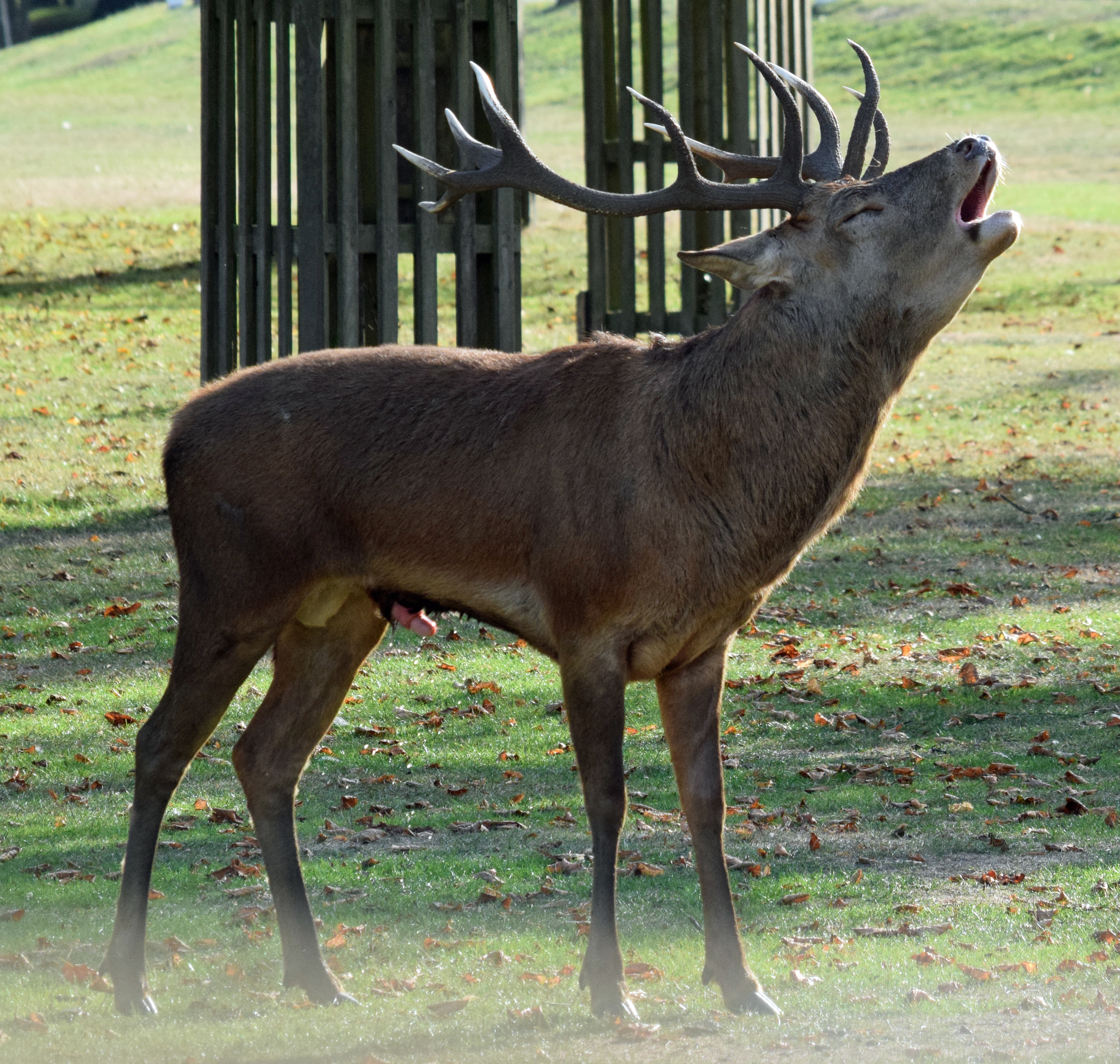
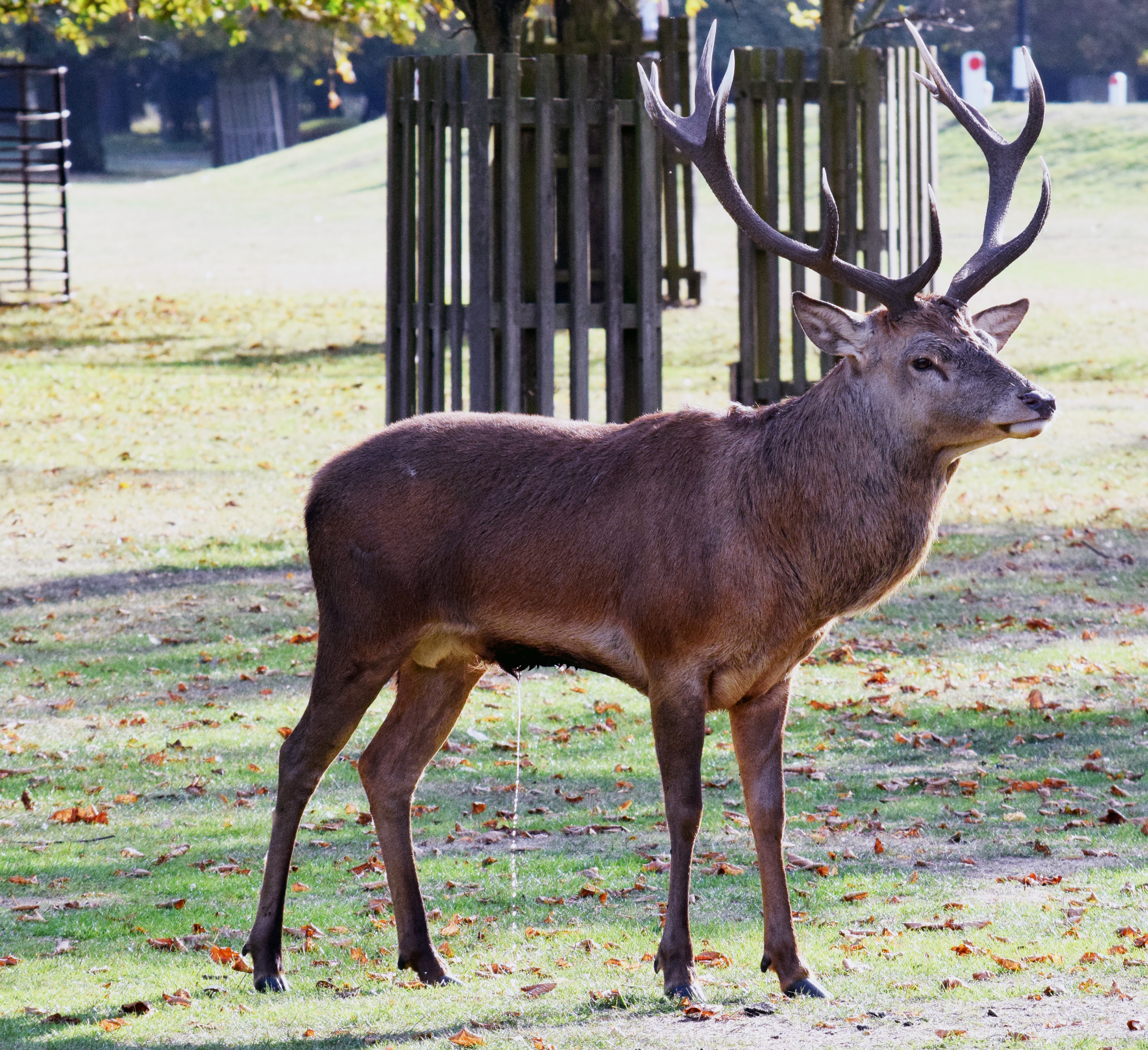
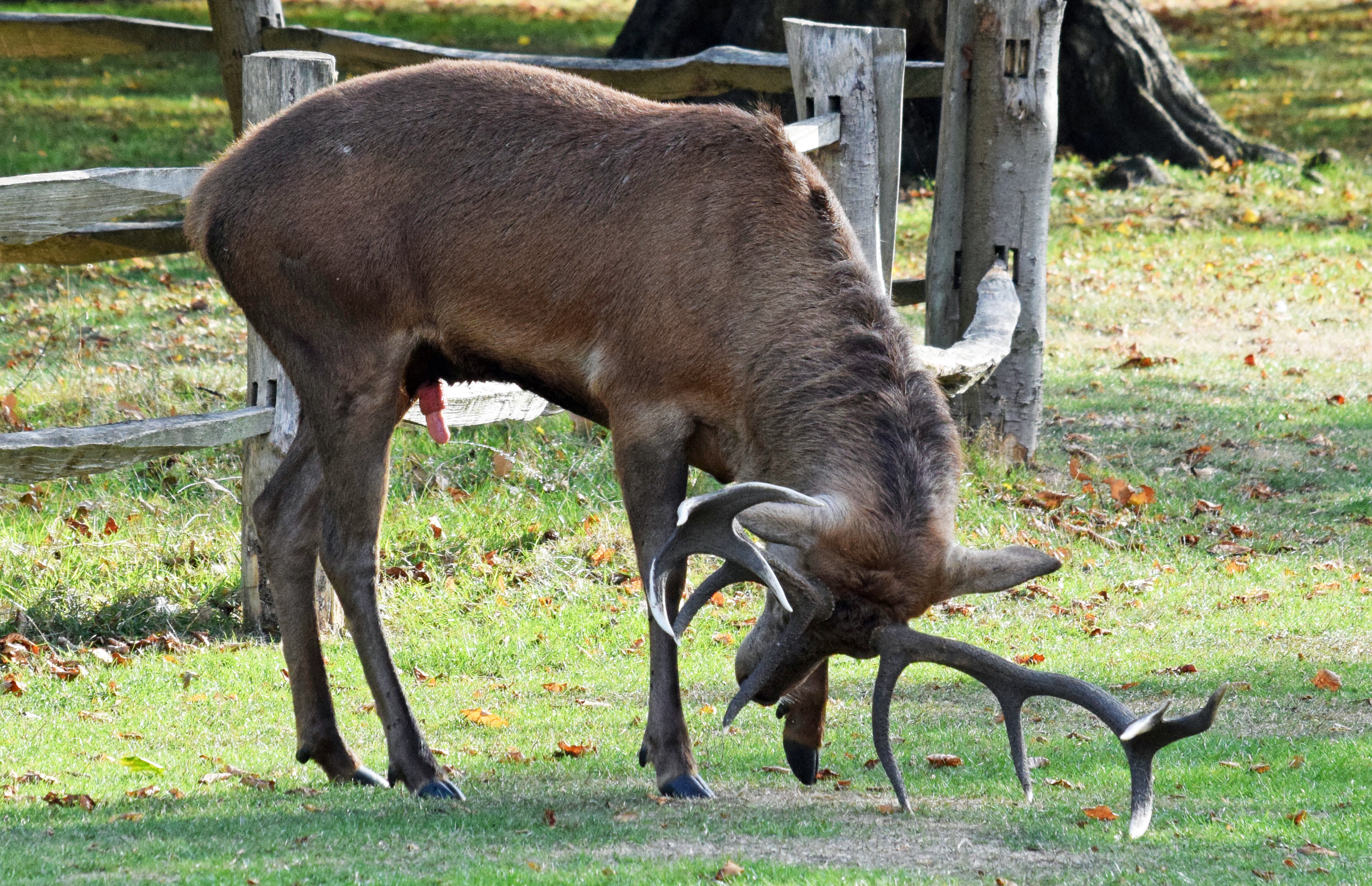
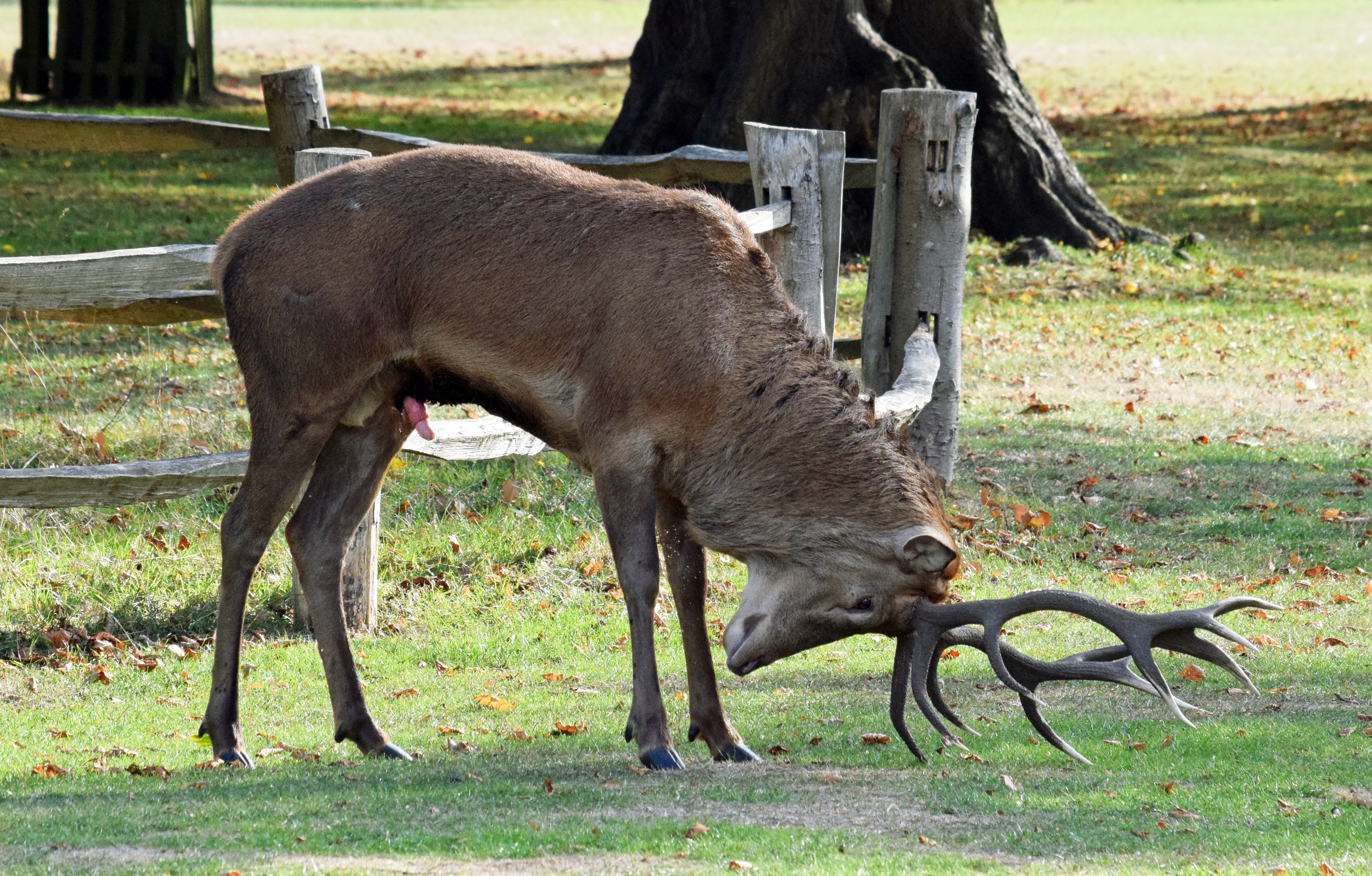
Red deer "anointing" himself in Bushy Park

Male red deer anoint their wallows with urine and roll in these in a very similar way to elk.

=== Goats ===
Male goats self-anoint with their urine. This is done by extending the penis, bending the haunches and extending the head backwards causing the urine to hit the mouth, throat, face and beard. This type of urination is possibly an indicator of rank and physical condition, and plays an important role in goat reproduction.

== Rodents ==
The rice-field rat (Rattus rattoides) displays self-anointing behaviour in response to the anal-gland secretions of the weasel Mustela sibirica; however, they do not respond to the faeces and urine of the red fox (Vulpes vulpes). Juvenile rats born in the laboratory with no experience of weasels also display self-anointing behaviour. In this species, the self-anointing behaviour is not sex-specific or age-specific.

Ground squirrels chew rattlesnake skins and then lick their fur, a behaviour likely to deter that particular predator.

== Hedgehogs ==
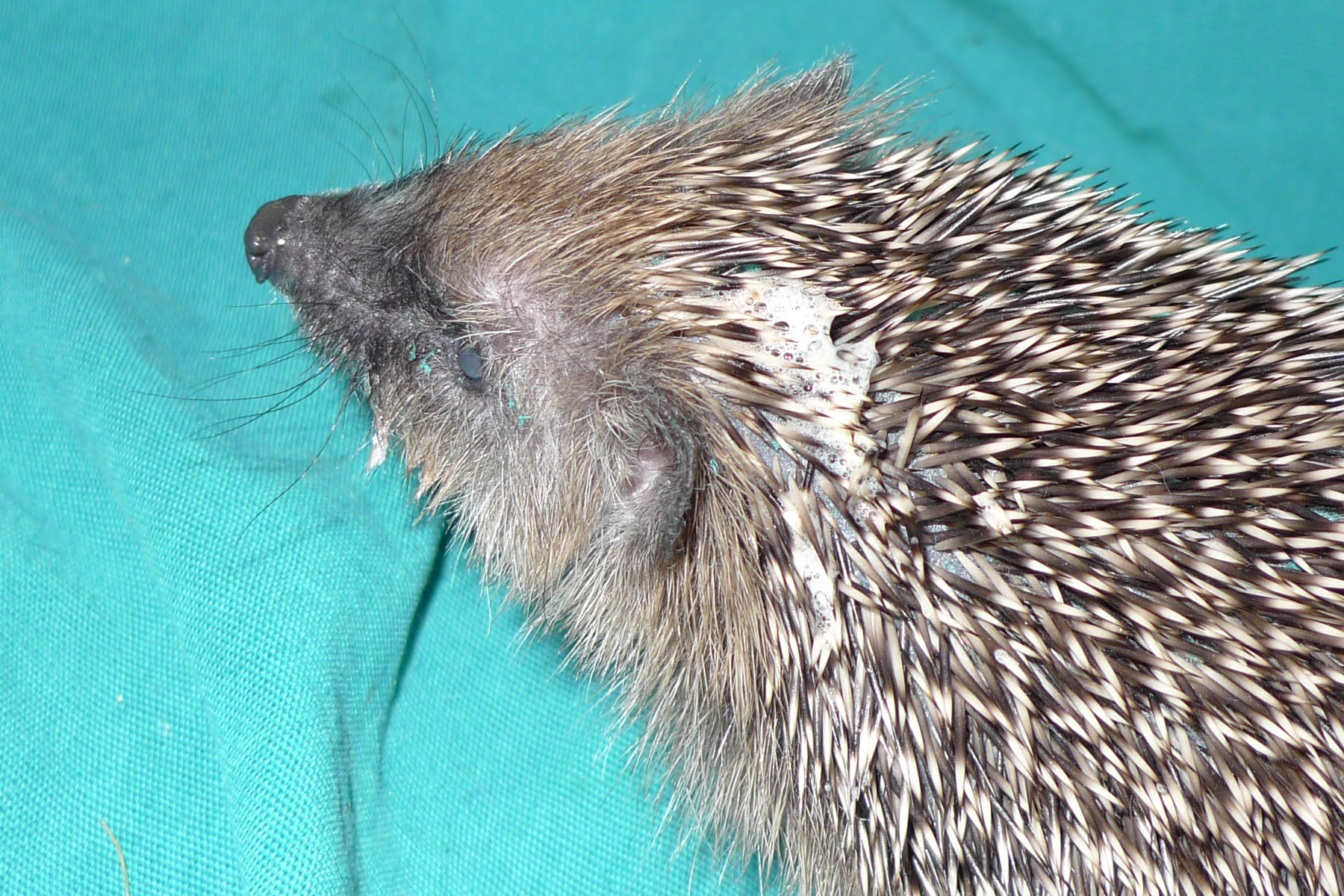
Frothy saliva visible on the head of a juvenile male European hedgehog after self-anointing

European hedgehogs (Erinaceus europaeus) have been widely reported to self-anoint with a range of toxic and irritating substances, particularly when introduced to a new or strong-smelling substance. These substances include toad skin, tobacco, soap and faecal matter. The hedgehog chews and licks at these substances when it encounters them which produces frothy saliva-substance mix that the hedgehog then spreads onto its spines. Young hedgehogs will react to these substances and sometimes also lick substances on the spines of their mothers and self-anoint. Self-anointing has been observed in hedgehogs as young as 15 days of age, before their eyes open.

In one study, indications of self-anointing were observed in more than 11% of all observations. First-year, independent young self-anointed more than adults, and male hedgehogs had more indications of self-anointing than females. Self-anointing in adults displayed a peak in the summer, while no clear pattern was observed for young. It was concluded that self-anointing is dependent on gender, age and season.

Various hypotheses have been proposed to explain the function of self-anointing in hedgehogs. It may function as a form of scent camouflage, to mask their own scent with the new scent in the environment. Hedgehogs are resistant to many toxins and one theory is that hedgehogs spread toxins on their quills as added protection. Hedgehogs will sometimes kill toads (Bufo), bite into the toads' poison glands and smear the toxic mixture on their spines.

== Carnivora ==
=== Canines ===
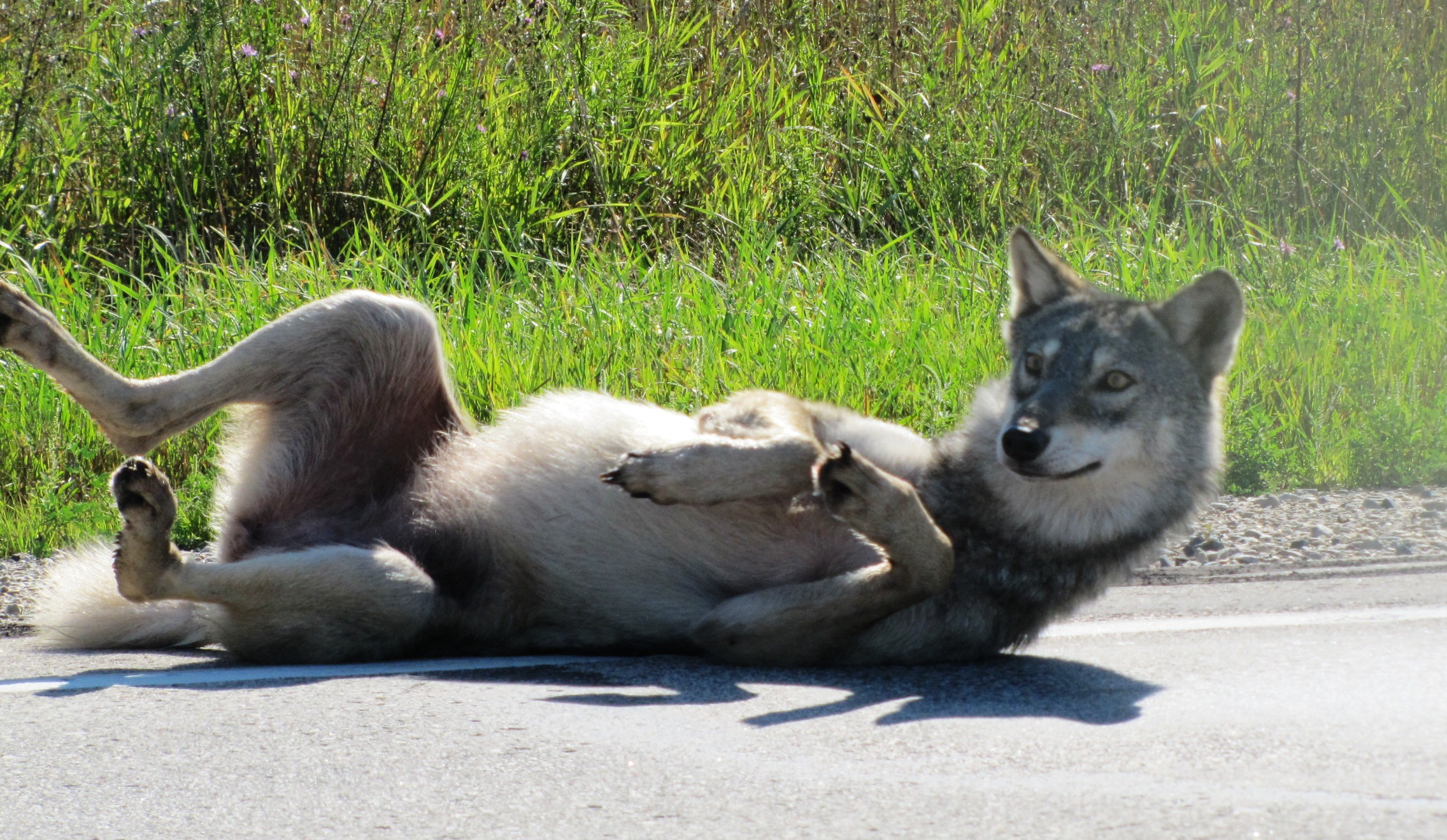
A female wolf scent-rolling

Several canines self-anoint. In these species, it is sometimes known as scent rolling.

==== Domestic dogs ====
Domestic dogs often roll in odoriferous substances, choosing items such as cow manure, a road kill, or rotten fish.

==== Wolves ====
Captive wolves will scent roll in a wide range of substances including animal feces, carrion (elk, mouse, pig, badger), mint extract, perfume, animal repellant, fly repellent, etc.

==== Bears ====
North American brown bears (Ursus arctos) make a paste of Osha roots (Ligusticum porteri) and saliva and rub it through their fur to repel insects or soothe bites. This plant, locally known as bear root, contains 105 active compounds, such as coumarins that may repel insects when topically applied. Navajo Indians are said to have learned to use this root medicinally from the bear for treating stomach aches and infections.

== Birds ==
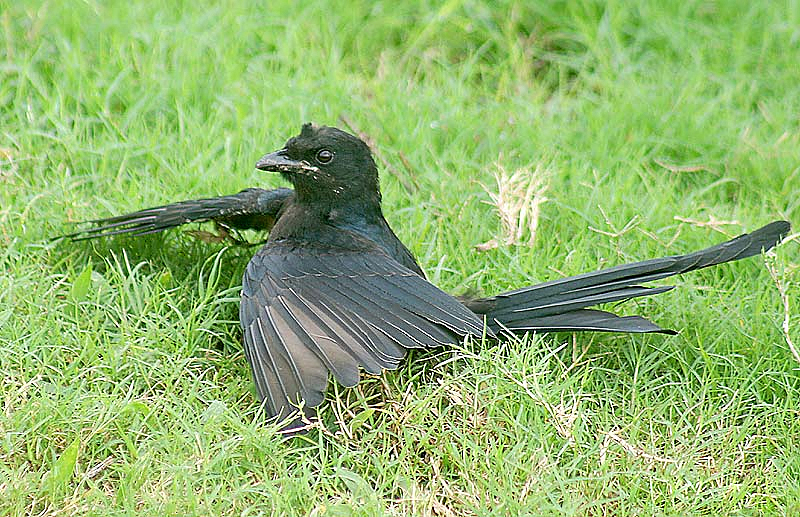
A black drongo in a typical "anting" posture

The use of millipedes in self-anointing by birds has been reported for the strong-billed woodcreeper (Xiphocolaptes promeropirhyncus) in Belize, the little shrike-thrush (Colluricincla megarhyncha parvula) in Australia, the black-throated shrikebill (Clytorhynchus nigrogularis) and the jungle mynah (Acridotheres fuscus) in the Fiji Islands, the European robin (Erithacus rubecula) in England and the grey-winged trumpeter (Psophia crepitans) and the pale-winged trumpeter (P. leucoptera) in northern South America.

In one study, mothballs (which contain naphthalene) were placed in a flowerbed. A common grackle picked one out, extended its left wing and rubbed the mothball up and down the length of the shaft of each of the secondary feathers. The grackle went on to rub the mothball over its secondary coverts on the ventral side and onto the propatagium area. The grackle then repeated the same rubbing actions on its right wing. The entire rubbing behaviour lasted approximately 10 minutes. European starlings also performed a similar behaviour with mothballs.

During anting, birds rub insects on their feathers, usually ants, which secrete liquids containing chemicals such as formic acid. These can act as an insecticide, miticide, fungicide, bactericide, or to make the insects edible by removing the distasteful acid. It possibly also supplements the bird's own preen oil. Although it has been suggested that anting acts as a way of reducing feather parasites such as mites or in controlling fungi or bacteria, there has been little convincing support for any of the theories. Some cases of anting involved the use of millipedes or puss moth caterpillars, and these too are known to release powerful defensive chemicals.

Another suggested function, based on observation of blue jays, is that the bird makes the insects edible, by discharging the harmful acid onto their feathers. The birds were found to show anting behaviour only if the ants had a full acid sac, and with subjects whose acid sacs had been experimentally removed, the behaviour was absent.

Finally, it has also been suggested that anting is related to feather moulting. The metabolic products of the ants may soothe skin irritated by unusually rapid feather replacement. However, the correlation may also be attributed to the greater activity of ants in summer.

== Related behaviours ==
Some birds like antbirds and flickers not only wear ants, but also consume the ants as an important part of their diet. Other opportunist ant-eating birds include sparrows, wrens, grouse and starlings.

=== Social anointing ===
Owl monkeys (Aotus spp.) will anoint each other in groups of two or more by rubbing their bodies against one another while self-anointing with millipedes. Social anointing has been observed anecdotally in a captive colony for almost ten years. In 24, 5-min presentations to this group, a total of 25 separate bouts of social anointing were observed. Twenty-four of 35 owl monkeys were observed to socially anoint, including all ages and both sexes, in bouts which ranged from 5–322 seconds.

== See also ==
- Ring-tailed lemur#Olfactory communication
- Personal grooming
