= Tiger penis =

Traditional Chinese medicine ingredient

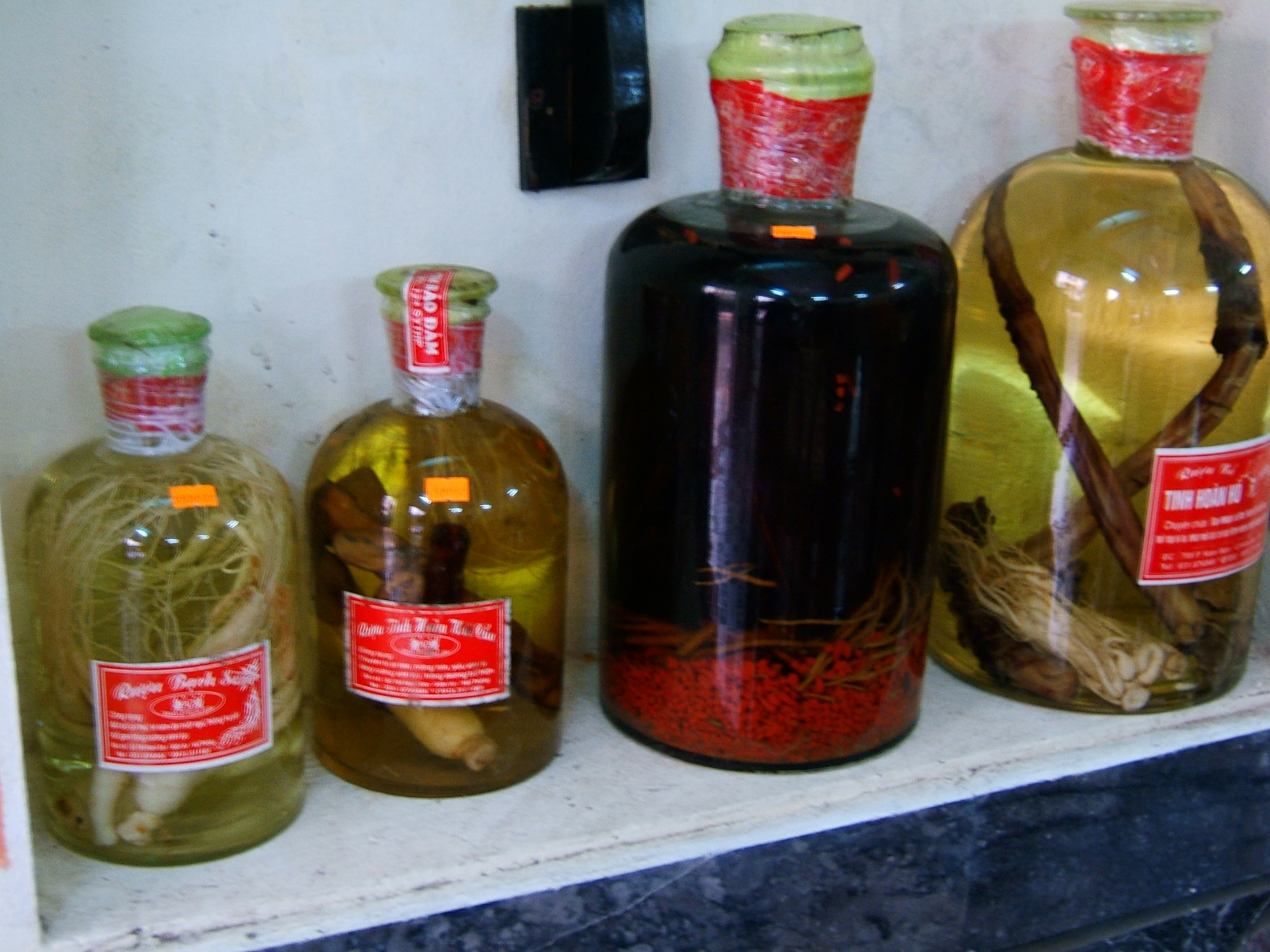
Several varieties of rượu thuốc. The first bottle from the right contains tiger penis.

In traditional Chinese medicine, tiger penis (Vietnamese: Pín hổ; Chinese: 虎鞭; pinyin: hǔ biān) is said to have important therapeutic properties. However, there is no scientific proof that tiger penis (or any other animal phallus) can be used to treat any medical disorder. The demand for tiger parts exacerbates the endangered status of the tiger by providing a market for poachers. While tiger penis is consumed in parts of China and Southeast Asia, the consumption of tiger penis is often condemned by most global environmental groups.

Genuine tiger genitals are unlikely to be found for sale in public markets; what is usually sold is a fraudulent product made from beef cattle.

== Health ==
The penis of a tiger, when consumed, is said to be a potent aphrodisiac and an effective treatment for erectile dysfunction. However, there is no scientific evidence to support the usage of tiger penis in the treatment of any disorder. This persistent folk belief has contributed to the poaching of tigers for their presumed benefits, the penis being just one of the tiger's many supposed medicinal assets. A very large underground market in China and other parts of Asia exists to keep up with constant demand for tiger parts.

Medical studies conducted by scholars at the University of New South Wales and the University of Alaska claim that as the Chinese people are rapidly modernizing, more and more men are using sildenafil (Viagra) instead of folk remedies to treat erectile dysfunction. The researchers surveyed 256 Chinese men, aged 50 to 76, who sought treatment at a large TCM clinic in Hong Kong over their methods to treat impotence. Although the studies indicated that older men in China are finding sildenafil (Viagra) to be a more effective treatment, they also indicated that they still resort to alternative treatments of (other) ailments such as arthritis, indigestion and gout.

== Cuisine ==
People have been known to spend up to $5700 (£3000) on a particularly rare tiger penis dish, which needed to be ordered months in advance. In the 1990s, dried tiger penis was reported to have been sold at around $2500 (£1300) in Singapore and Taiwan. The penis can be taken in soup, ground in wine (tiger penis wine), or soaked in rice. One method of preparation, particularly in the Mekong River Delta, is to place a dried tiger penis, with testicles still attached, into a bottle of French cognac or Chinese wine and let it soak for a number of weeks. Then, as it matures, the liquor is taken in sips every night.

== See also ==
- Tiger penis soup
