= Korean bug =

Chinese - Korean aphrodisiac

Korean bug is a popular aphrodisiac in China, Korea, and Southeast Asia, either eaten alive or in gelatin form. The aphrodisiac effect has not been clinically tested and is achieved by cantharidin inhibition of phosphodiesterase, protein phosphatase activity and stimulation of adrenergic receptors, which leads to vascular congestion and inflammation. Cantharidin is an unreliable and dangerous aphrodisiac. Its impact is primarily based totally on stimulation of the urogenital tract, robust pelvic hyperaemia with consequent erection or a possible priapism.

The bug is type of a beetle of Palembus dermestoides species. Medical studies have shown that it is a vector of causative agent of hymenolepiasis.
