= Tiger penis soup =

Soup made from a tiger's penis

Tiger penis soup (Chinese: 虎鞭汤; pinyin: Hǔ biān tāng) is a Chinese soup prepared with tiger penis. It is typically an expensive dish, due to the rarity of tiger penis. In some cultures and countries, people believe that this dish can treat male sexual dysfunction—a notion that has not been supported by scientific evidences. There has been opposition to the dish from environmental organizations, and ongoing consumption of the soup has contributed to the decline of tiger populations. The legality of the dish varies in different countries, as tigers are a protected species. Some shops in China and Hong Kong may sell deer or cattle parts while claiming that they are tiger penis.

== Overview ==
Preparation involves soaking dried tiger penis in water and then cooking it along with other medicines and spices. Sometimes tiger bone is also included in the soup's preparation.

Prices are expensive due to the rarity of tiger penis. Tiger penis soup has been sold for US$300 a bowl in China and other places in the Orient, and can cost as much as US$400. In 1998 in Southeast Asian and East Asian markets, the soup sold for US$350 per bowl. Chris Coggins reported in 2002 that the dish was available and had been consumed in various Chinatowns.

== Medicinal beliefs ==
Some people and cultures in Asia believe that tiger penis soup acts as a medicinal aphrodisiac, can improve one's sexual performance or virility, or cure impotence. However, consumption of cooked animal genitalia does not increase testosterone levels in humans. Furthermore, there is no empirical evidence of tiger penis being correlated with sexual enhancement in humans. It has been stated that men may be fooled into thinking their sexual prowess is increased by consuming tiger penis soup due to the placebo effect, in which the placebo effect acts to counteract mild impotence, rather than the soup.

== Legality ==
Tigers are an endangered, protected species. Environmental groups often claim that consumption of tiger is unethical due to the animal's endangered status. The poaching, killing, and sale of tiger products are illegal throughout the tiger's native range, including India and China.

== Opposition ==
In 1996, the Wildlife Conservation Society, an organization that focuses upon wildlife conservation, ran an international advertising campaign stating that claims of sexual potency being enhanced from consuming tiger penis soup are fraudulent. It has been stated that beliefs of tiger penis soup contributing to sexual enhancement has contributed to the endangerment of tiger populations, because of tiger poaching that occurs due to the high prices penises and other animal parts can command. Additionally, a high demand for tiger penis soup has significantly contributed to reductions in tiger populations.

== See also ==
- List of soups
