= Fork Me, Spoon Me =

2006 cookbook by Amy Reiley

Fork Me, Spoon Me: The sensual cookbook
- First edition cover
- Author: Amy Reiley
- Language: English
- Subject: Cooking
- Publisher: Life of Reiley
- Publication date: January 1, 2006
- Publication place: United States
- Media type: Print (Paperback)
- Pages: 142 pp (first edition)
- ISBN: 978-0-9774120-0-6
- OCLC: 85866208

Fork Me, Spoon Me: The sensual cookbook is a cookbook by Amy Reiley. It was published in 2006 by Life of Reiley, the author's publishing, consulting and speaking company.

== Book ==
Fork Me, Spoon Me is 142 pages of recipes using ingredients which are thought to have an aphrodisiac effect. The book features 12 ingredients noted for their aphrodisiac history which are: mint, ginger root, rosemary, vanilla, chocolate, almonds, figs, peaches, mango, chile peppers, honey and saffron. Each ingredient is used in three to four recipes with tips for presentation and when to serve. Reiley includes references to ancient cultures and individuals that have mentioned foods having an aphrodisiac potential.

Fork Me, Spoon Me was inspired by and fashioned after the Joy of Sex — the chapter layout and flow of content is similar. The recipes in Fork Me, Spoon Me were created so that none requires a knife to eat. Only a fork, spoon and/or fingers are needed, hence the title of the cookbook.

Fork Me, Spoon Me has been mentioned by the National Geographic, The Times, Marie Claire and The New York Daily News. The cookbook has also led to appearances on news and entertainment programs throughout the United States and Canada, Australia and Britain.

== See also ==
- The Joy of Cooking
