= Rut (mammalian reproduction) =

Mating season of ruminant mammals

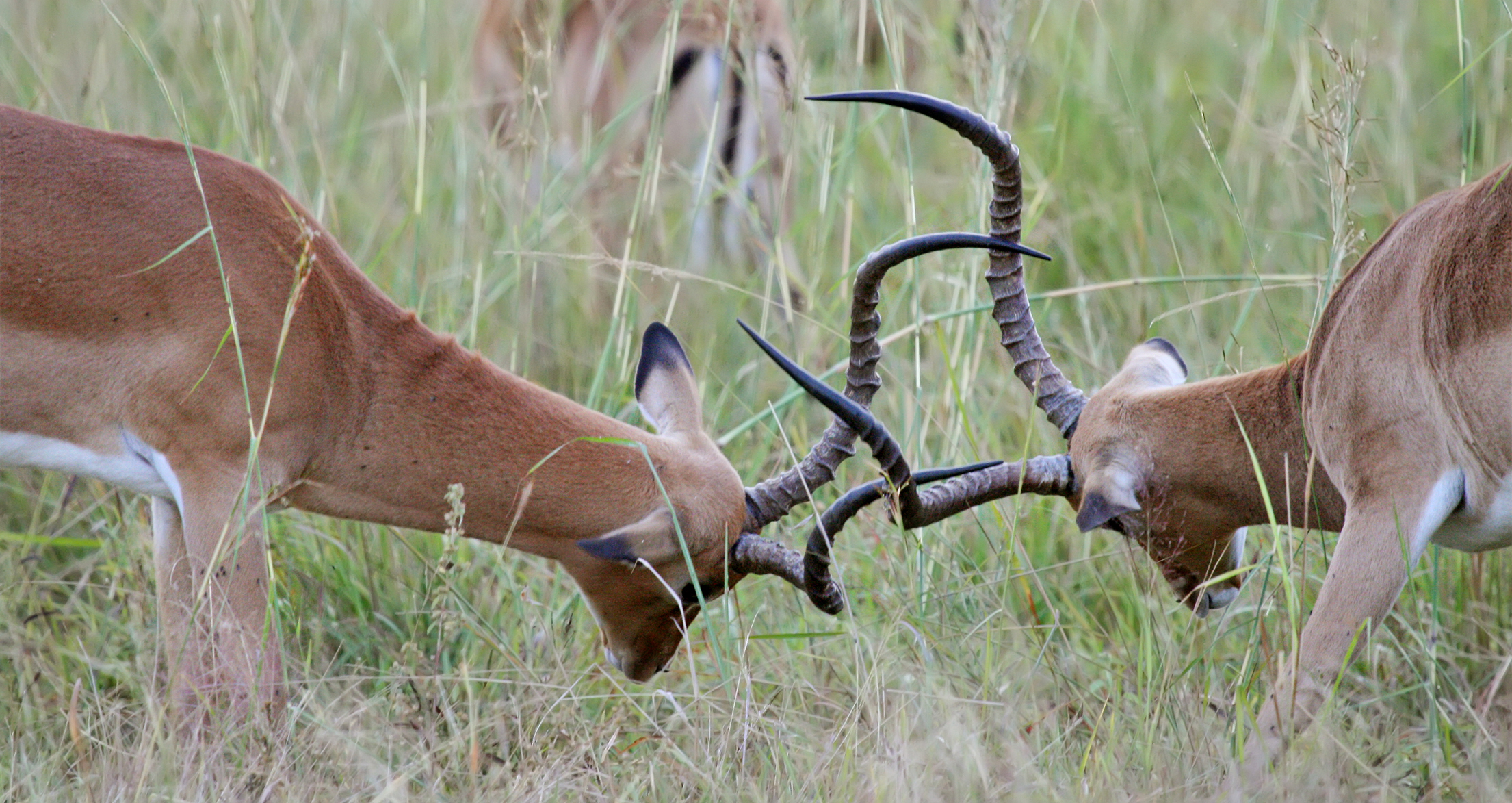
Male impalas fighting during the rut or breeding season

The rut (from the Latin rugire, meaning "to roar") is the mating season of certain mammals, which includes ungulates such as deer, sheep, camels, goats, pronghorns, bison, giraffes and antelopes, and extends to animals in other groups such as skunks and elephants. The rut is characterized in males by an increase in testosterone, exaggerated sexual dimorphisms, increased aggression, as well as increased interest in females. The males of the species may mark themselves with mud, undergo physiological changes or perform characteristic displays in order to make themselves more visually appealing to the females. Males also use olfaction to entice females to mate using secretions from glands and soaking in their own urine.

During the rut (known as the rutting period and in domestic sheep management as tupping), males often rub their antlers or horns on trees or shrubs, fight with each other, wallow in mud or dust, self-anoint, and herd estrus females together. These displays make the male conspicuous and aid in mate selection.

The rut in many species is triggered by shorter day lengths. For different species, the timing of the rut depends on the length of the gestation period (pregnancy), usually occurring so the young are born in the spring. This is shortly after new green growth has appeared thereby providing food for the females, allowing them to provide milk for the young, and when the temperatures are warm enough to reduce the risk of young becoming hypothermic.

== Cervidae ==
Red deer during the rut

=== White-tailed deer ===
The rut for white-tailed deer (Odocoileus virginianus) usually lasts three weeks in the Northern Hemisphere and may occur most of the year in tropical zones. The rut is the time when white-tail deer, especially bucks, are more active and less cautious than usual. This makes them easier to hunt, as well as more susceptible to being hit by motor vehicles.

Outdoors writer Charles Alsheimer has done research demonstrating the white-tailed deer rut is also controlled by the lunar phase and that the rut peaks seven days after the second full moon during October and November (the rutting moon), while elk begin rutting during the September equinox on 21 September.

A white-tail doe may be in estrus for up to 72 hours and may come into estrus up to seven times if she does not mate. Cows may come into estrus up to four or more times if they do not mate. Some people believe that it is possible that does can enter a second estrus around 28 to 30 days from its first estrus if the doe isn't bred. There are also studies that show that some does actively participate in seeking out possible mates in areas where there are less males to increase the chances of finding males and being bred.

The rut can start as early as the end of September and can last all the way through the winter months. Bucks usually begin this process when the velvet is falling off their antlers, and it can last all the way until they start to shed their antlers. The peak of the rut, however, is right in the middle. The average peak day for the white-tail rut in the U.S. is November 13. Around this period of time, the bucks and does are very active, with the rut in full swing. For a hunter sitting in a tree stand at this time of the year, it is not uncommon to see many deer pass through his specific area, due to other deer chasing others.

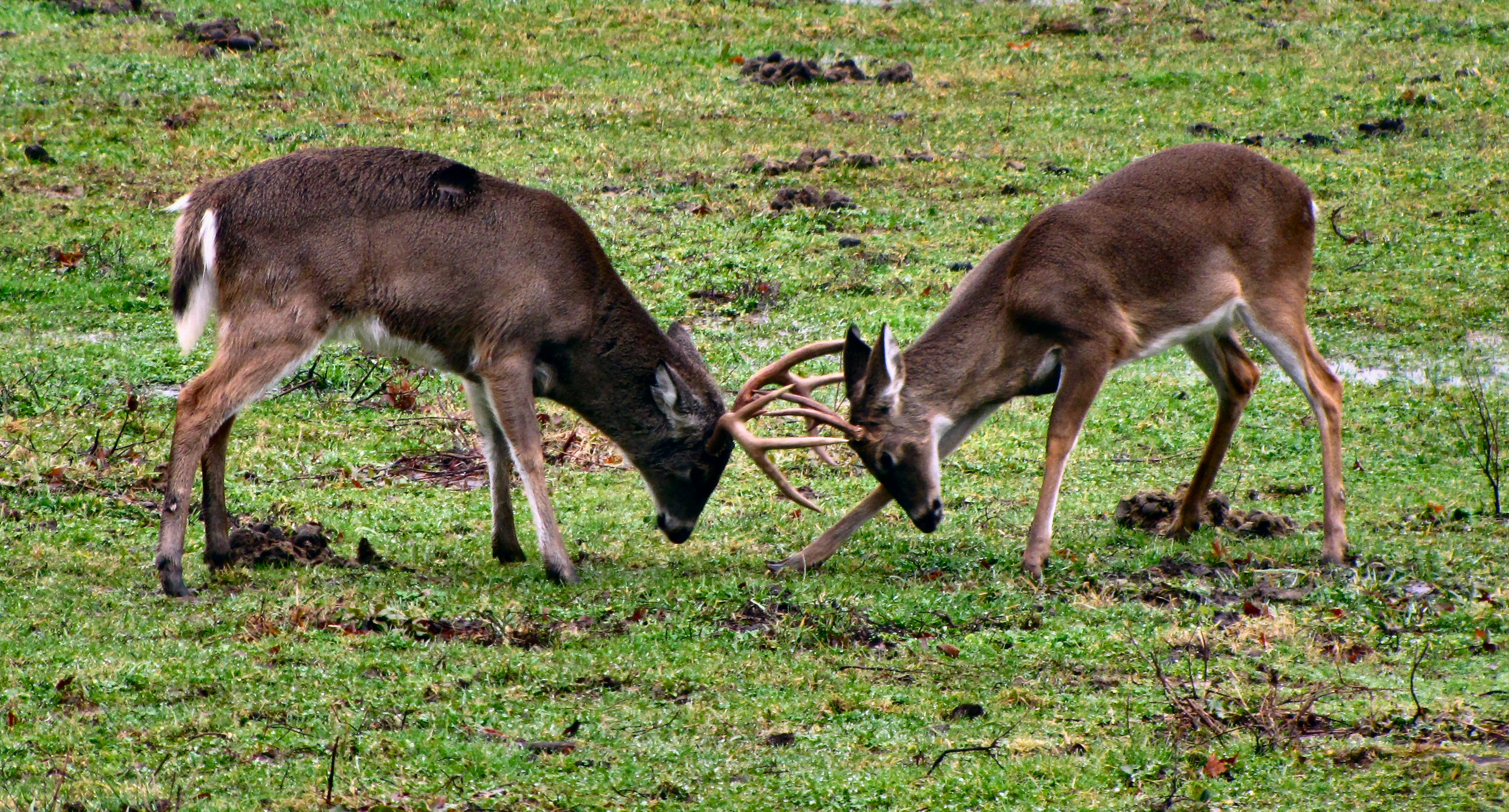
White-tailed bucks in late rut in the Great Smoky Mountains

There are many behaviors a buck will exhibit during the rut. During pre-rut, bucks will spar with each other. Sparring is low-intensity aggressive behavior, involving mostly pushing and shoving. Bucks of different sizes will do this to each other. After pre-rut is finished, a buck will rub his antlers on a tree (thus making a "rub"), and make scrapes on the ground with his hooves: both of these are ways a buck will mark its territory and proclaim his dominance for other bucks to see. These activities are usually done at night. Bucks will make many different scent markings using different scent glands. These scent glands include pedal glands found between the toes, preorbital glands found in the corners of their eyes, tarsal glands found on the lower inside of their hind legs, and the metatarsal glands found in the outside hind leg between ankle and hoof. The deer spread scent from these glands by rubbing hooves during ground scrapes, rubbing faces on tree limbs, and urinating down legs.

The most prominent behavior of all during the heat of the rut is fighting, where bucks show their true dominance to others. In fighting, bucks usually battle against similar-sized deer, and small bucks do not normally challenge mature large ones: more often than not, smaller bucks fear the more mature bucks and leave or avoid the dominant deer's territory. These fights can be long in duration with the winner getting the group of does. Some fights result in injuries with some resulting in death.

Studies show that males of all age-classes increased their search efforts for mates during rut. According to the source, "One-year-old males seemed to invest less effort searching for females because movement rates (m/h) were 25–30% lower than in older males". This data indicates that the youngest males don't try as hard as older males to find a mate. The energy expenditure of chasing and fighting during the breeding season can result in a buck losing an immense amount of weight, with some research documenting losses of as much as 20% of body weight with some sources showing body mass losses of up to 30%. On average, a buck before breeding season can weigh up to 180 pounds (82 kg). After he has gone through the stages of the rut, he can lose about 50 pounds (23 kg) of weight, which is quite large, especially for only a few months of time. In the post-rut, a buck will need to replenish his body and catch up on the weight and energy he has lost.

=== Elk (Wapiti) ===
In the Northern Hemisphere, elks rut between mid-August and mid-October. In the Southern Hemisphere the rut is between mid-February and mid-April. It lasts between 20 and 45 days, varying with latitude. During the rut, elk frequently use areas around fresh water, and tend to bed in heavy timber five to six hours per day. A cow elk remains in estrus for 12 to 15 hours; if they are not bred during this time frame they have another estrus cycle 18 to 28 days later.

Elk use several different vocalizations during the rut, with different purposes. Some are made only by a certain sex or age class. The first is the cohesion call, made by both sexes, and is used to locate one another. An alarm squeal is made by both sexes when they are on alert; during the rut these are used frequently by young bulls (male elks) being run off by the herd bull. Satellite bulls frequently spar with one another during the rut, and in turn make sparring squeaks.

A bugle is a vocalization made only by bulls. It has three acoustic parts, a low frequency "on-glide" that sounds guttural in tone, which then ascends into the highest frequency part of the call termed the "whistle", and the last portion of the call, the "off-glide" that returns to a low-frequency tone. The larger an animal gets the lower frequency of sound it is able to produce. A bugle thus demonstrates the size and fitness of the bull vocalizing. A bull directs his bugle toward his cows while gathering them or while chasing an estrus cow. A herd bull directs his bugle toward other bulls to express his dominance over the herd, while a satellite bull may use his bugle to challenge the herd bull. The reason for the high-frequency portion of the bugle is due to the propagative efficiency of differing frequencies through varying environments. As a bull's harem increases, meaning the cows become more dispersed, he tends to vocalize more frequently than if they were within closer proximity. The higher-pitched section of the call propagates through the environment better, which is why the bull uses it to congregate a harem that is becoming more spatially dispersed and thus harder to defend. Acoustic analyses comparing bull elk bugles with cow elk cohesion calls show a notable degree of acoustic similarity, indicating that both vocalizations may perform a congregating function, which is why the bugle is often used by the bull to condense his harem.

Yelping or "grunting" is made by excited herd bulls when they are excited, often while interacting with cows. "Yelping commonly was accompanied by contractions of the penile region with simultaneous emission of short spurts of urine."

==== Phases ====
The rut has six phases: the pre-rut, the first breeding phase, the first rest phase, the second breeding phase, the second rest phase, and the third breeding phase.

- The pre-rut takes place from mid-August through the beginning of September. During the pre-rut bulls begin bugling and gathering their herds. Bulls will bugle to attract cows as well as to express dominance over other bulls. A "herd" bull is the dominant bull in a herd. Younger, smaller bulls are known as satellite bulls, as they tend to cling to the edges of a herd trying to pick up any cows willing to leave the herd. Larger satellite bulls will challenge the herd bull to try and take control of the herd. These challenges include a good deal of bugling as well as fighting.
- The first breeding phase of the rut takes place between the beginning and the middle of September. This is when the three year and older cows come into estrus. During this time herd bulls bugle to keep their cows close by, they also answer the bugles of satellite bulls to let them know they are still dominant. A herd bull will also bugle while approaching a cow in estrus so the cows become familiar with his bugles.
- The first rest phase of the rut occurs between the middle and the end of September. At this time the older cows are predominantly out of estrus and the younger cows have not yet come into estrus. During the rest period, satellite bulls will try to join the herd while the herd bull is resting.
- The second breeding phase of the rut takes place three to four weeks after the first breeding phase. This is due to younger cows coming into estrus, as well as older cows that were not bred on their first estrus cycle coming back into estrus. Herd bulls are less aggressive towards satellite bulls at this phase in the rut due to exhaustion. The second phase of the rut may have the most bugling activity due to the combination of the testosterone levels of the younger bulls rising, and the herd bull still trying to maintain control of the herd.
- The second rest phase of the rut occurs around the middle of October. By this time the original herd bull usually does not have control of the herd, due to a great decline in physical condition. Terry Bowyer states, "Elk were observed feeding in the following percentages of observations: master bulls 24%; bachelor bulls 53%; yearling males 62%; cows 64%; and calves 62%" (Bowyer uses the terms "master bulls" and "bachelor bulls" which have the same meaning as "herd bulls" and "satellite bulls"). Herd bulls do not have time to feed during the rut due to constantly fighting other bulls as well as chasing and breeding cows.
- Occasionally a third breeding phase will occur. This will usually take place around the end of October or early November. This is a result of yearling cows coming into estrus for the first time or two-year-old cows coming into a second estrus cycle. Since most of the herd bulls have left the herd by this time of year, the breeding is usually done by the younger satellite bulls. After this phase the rut is over, most bulls will leave the cows and form bachelor herds to spend the winter with; however young bulls will usually remain with the cows throughout the winter.

=== Fallow deer ===
The fallow deer (Dama dama) is an ungulate which employs an unusual strategy for mating during the rut. This strategy is the creation of a lek, a display area presented to the females where the males gather and allow the females to choose a mate based upon their traits alone while reducing predation risk, disturbance to copulation, parasite transmission and the cost of looking for a mate. When females come to the lek they leave soon after mating but the males will tend to stay in the lek to court other females until the end of the rutting season. However, male fallow deer which are unsuccessful in mating will leave the lek sooner than other males and they will adopt other strategies to compensate for their lack of mating success in the lek. Furthermore, the duration spent in the lek is positively correlated with the behavioral traits of male display frequency and aggression, male hierarchical position and secondary sex characteristics such as antler size. Overall, lekking species such as the fallow deer have a short intense rutting season where the males face intrasexual competition, territory defense and management of females within their territory.

=== Moose ===
Moose (known as elk in Europe) have a series of rutting events that are similar to those seen in other deer species, however, they have several characteristic behaviors which give them a distinct rut. The first of these behaviors is a challenger gait where the bull moose will sway back and forth and circle the rival bull while dipping his antlers down. Another typical behaviour seen in moose especially during the pre-rut stage is mock battling. This is a display to scare away other rival males where the bull moose destroys trees and vegetation prior to engaging in a fight. Also, a behaviour known as displacement feeding is observed in male moose and it refers to the hasty movements made by the moose while it is feeding as it keeps an intense gaze upon rival bull moose. Furthermore, as seen in other deer species male moose will dig mud pits and soak them in urine and the females will fight over possession of these wallows. The pre-rutting season typically begins during August and is marked by bull moose leaving the younger satellite bulls. During this stage there is much mock fighting and the pre-rut ends in September when the bull moose emerge from the solidarity of heavily wooded areas. Then begins the searching stage of the rut where the male seeks the moose cow in estrus and the instances of displacement feeding and tension between rival males increases. Once a potential mate has been found the male enters the display stage of the stage which lasts one to three days. During this time he will court the female by standing sidewise three to five yards from the female moose to show himself as a mate. If successful he will get to mate with her for several days and then move on to a new partner. This pattern of behaviours will then repeat with successive mates until late October or early November. Following the mating season, bull moose spend long hours resting and feeding before forming their usual winter groupings.

Although the battle between males is the main contest, there is also a battle between females. Usually, this occurs between an older cow moose and a younger female. The mature cow will attempt to stop the younger one from coming near to the wallow in a vicious attack with her forelegs. If the younger female gets to lie in the wallow, the older female will drive her out of it, only to return to lie in it and take up as much space as possible. During this event the bull moose will not interfere and he will just watch in plain sight.

== Elephants ==
In elephants, the breeding season is less pronounced than in ungulates and it usually spikes when the rains season occurs or shortly thereafter. The rut is observed in both African and Asian elephants and it is referred to as musth. Its meaning is derived from the Urdu word mast meaning intoxication. The most prominent characteristics of an elephant in rut are heightened sexual and aggressive activity along with copious temporal gland secretion and continual urine discharge. Also it has been observed that males will have a higher concentration of testosterone and an increased likelihood of associating with female groups during musth. Similarly to deer or mountain goats, elephants will tusk the ground throwing vegetation, logs and objects into the air and occasionally at subordinates.

== Other mammals ==
- Sexual behavior of impalas
- Spanish ibex § Mating
- Muskox § Social behavior and reproduction
- Argali § Reproduction
- Camel § Biology

== See also ==
- Even-toed ungulate § Reproduction and life expectancy
- Lek
