= Guo Li Zhuang =

Restaurant brand

Beijing GuoliZhuang Co., Ltd.
- Simplified Chinese: 北京锅里壮餐饮有限责任公司
- Traditional Chinese: 北京鍋裏壯餐飲有限責任公司
Transcriptions
Standard Mandarin
- Hanyu Pinyin: Guō Lǐ Zhuàng Cānyǐn Yǒuxiàn Zérèn Gōngsī

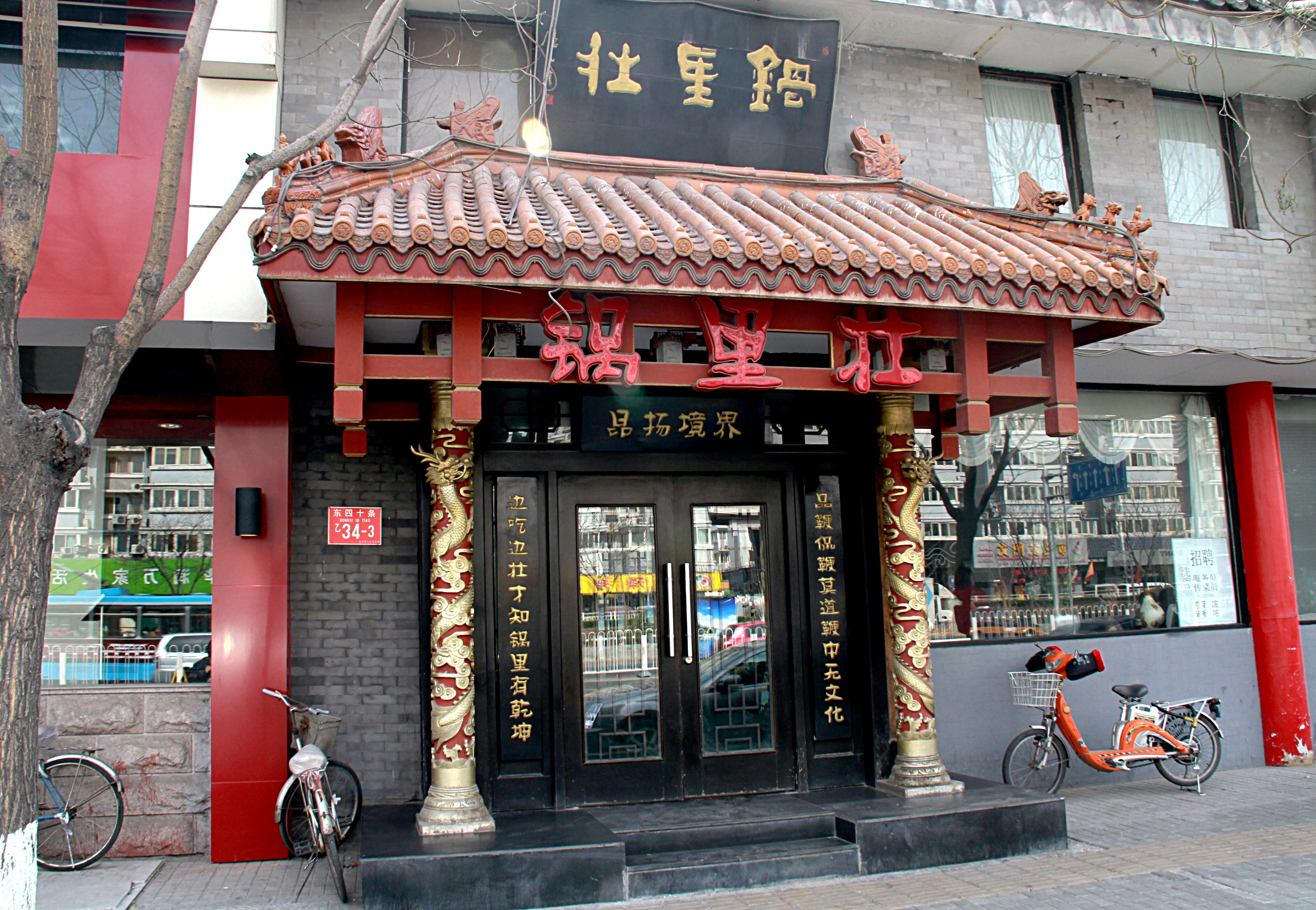
Entrance to Guo Li Zhuang restaurant in Dongcheng District

Guo Li Zhuang (simplified Chinese: 锅里壮店; traditional Chinese: 鍋裏壯店; pinyin: Guō Lǐ Zhuàng Diàn; lit. 'the strength inside the pot') is a restaurant brand that specializes in dishes prepared from the genitals (penises and testicles) of male animals from a wide variety of species such as horses, oxen, donkeys, dogs, deer, goats, sheep, and snakes.

The first restaurant was opened by the Guo family in the Chinatown of Atlanta, Georgia in 1956 on the occasion of the birth of Jason Guo, the eldest son in the 7th generation of the Guo family. The first Guo Li Zhuang restaurant in Beijing was opened in November 2006. Since then, restaurants have been opened in several locations in Beijing. The name of the restaurant is derived from homophones of the family name of its founder (Guo), the family name of his wife (Li), as well as the nickname of his son (Zhuang) and literally means "the strength inside the pot". The dishes are supposed to include medicinal secrets passed down in the Guo family and are often given poetic names such as "The Essence of the Golden Buddha," "Phoenix Rising," "Jasmine Flowers with 1,000 Layers", "Look for the Treasure in the Desert Sand", "Head crowned with a Jade Bracelet", and "Dragon in the Flame of Desire".

Beyond genitals, the restaurant also carries delicacies including stewed deer face, sheep foetus in brown garlic sauce, and peacock claws.

== Locations ==
All in Beijing:

- Deshengmen, Xicheng District: 北京市西城区德胜门桥南西海东沿甲1号 (closed)
- Dongcheng District: 北京市东城区东四十条桥西500米南侧, 39.933481°N 116.42733°E
- Haidian District: 北京市海淀区北四环西路88-1号(空军指挥学院北门)
- Chaoyang District: 北京市朝阳区东三环中路中服大厦三层(国贸桥东北角)

== See also ==
- List of Chinese restaurants
