= Aphrodisiac =

Substance that arouses sexual desires

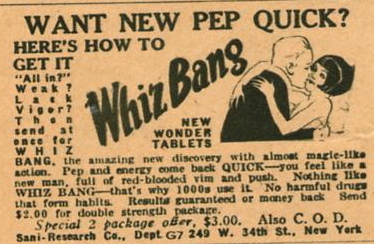
An advertisement for pills from 1926 implies an aphrodisiac effect: "full of red-blooded vim and push".

An aphrodisiac is a substance that increases libido, sexual desire, sexual attraction, sexual pleasure, or sexual behavior. These substances range from a variety of plants, spices, and foods to synthetic chemicals. Natural aphrodisiacs, such as cannabis or cocaine, are classified into plant-based and non-plant-based substances. Synthetic aphrodisiacs include MDMA and methamphetamine. Aphrodisiacs can be classified by their type of effects (psychological or physiological). Aphrodisiacs that contain hallucinogenic properties, such as bufotenin, have psychological effects that can increase sexual desire and sexual pleasure. Aphrodisiacs that have smooth muscle relaxing properties, such as yohimbine, have physiological effects that can affect hormone concentrations and increase blood flow. Substances that have the opposite effects on libido are called anaphrodisiacs. Aphrodisiac effects can also be due to the placebo effect.

Both males and females can potentially benefit from the use of aphrodisiacs, but they are more focused on males, as their properties tend to increase testosterone concentrations rather than estrogen concentrations. This is in part due to the historical context of aphrodisiacs, which focused solely on males. Only recently has attention been paid to understanding how aphrodisiacs can aid female sexual function. In addition, cultural influences on appropriate sexual behavior of males and females also play a part in the research gap.

== History ==
The word comes from the Greek ἀφροδισιακόν, aphrodisiakon 'sexual, aphrodisiac', from aphrodisios 'pertaining to Aphrodite', the Greek goddess of love. Throughout human history, food, drinks, and behaviors have had a reputation for making sex more attainable and/or pleasurable. However, from a historical and scientific standpoint, the alleged results may have been mainly due to mere belief on the part of their users that they would be effective (a placebo effect). Likewise, many medicines are reported to affect libido in inconsistent or idiopathic ways: enhancing or diminishing overall sexual desire, depending on the circumstances. For example, bupropion (Wellbutrin) is known as an antidepressant that can counteract other co-prescribed antidepressants with libido-diminishing effects. However, because bupropion increases libido only when it is already impaired by related medications, it is not generally classed as an aphrodisiac.

Ancient civilizations like Chinese, Indian, Egyptian, Roman, and Greek cultures believed that certain substances could provide the key to improving sexual desire, sexual pleasure, and/or sexual behavior. This was important because some men suffered from erectile dysfunction and could not reproduce. Men who could not impregnate their wives and father large families were seen as failures, whereas those who could were respected. Hence, a stimulant was needed. Others who did not suffer from this also desired performance enhancers. Regardless of their usage, these substances gained popularity and began to be documented, information being passed down generations. There are Hindu poems dated back to around 2000 to 1000 BCE that spoke of performance enhancers, ingredients, and usage tips. Chinese texts date back to 2697 to 2595 BC. Roman and Chinese cultures documented their belief in aphrodisiac qualities in animal genitalia, while Egyptians wrote tips for treating erectile dysfunction. In post-classical West Africa, a volume titled Advising Men on Sexual Engagement with Their Women from the Timbuktu Manuscripts acted as a guide on aphrodisiacs and infertility remedies. It offered advice to men on "winning back" their wives. According to Hammer, "At a time when women’s sexuality was barely acknowledged in the West, the manuscript, a kind of Baedeker to orgasm, offered tips for maximizing sexual pleasure on both sides."

Ambergris, yohimbine, horny goat weed, ginseng, alcohol, toads from the genus Bufo, and certain foods are recorded throughout these texts as possessing aphrodisiac qualities. While many plants, extracts, or manufactured hormones have been proposed as aphrodisiacs, there is little high-quality clinical evidence of their efficacy or long-term safety. In 2020, Brian Earp and Julian Savulescu published a philosophy book titled Love Drugs: The Chemical Future of Relationships (UK title Love Is the Drug: The Chemical Future of Our Relationships). They argued that certain forms of medications can be ethically consumed as a "helpful complement" in relationships, both to fall in love and to fall out of it.

== Types ==
=== Ambergris ===
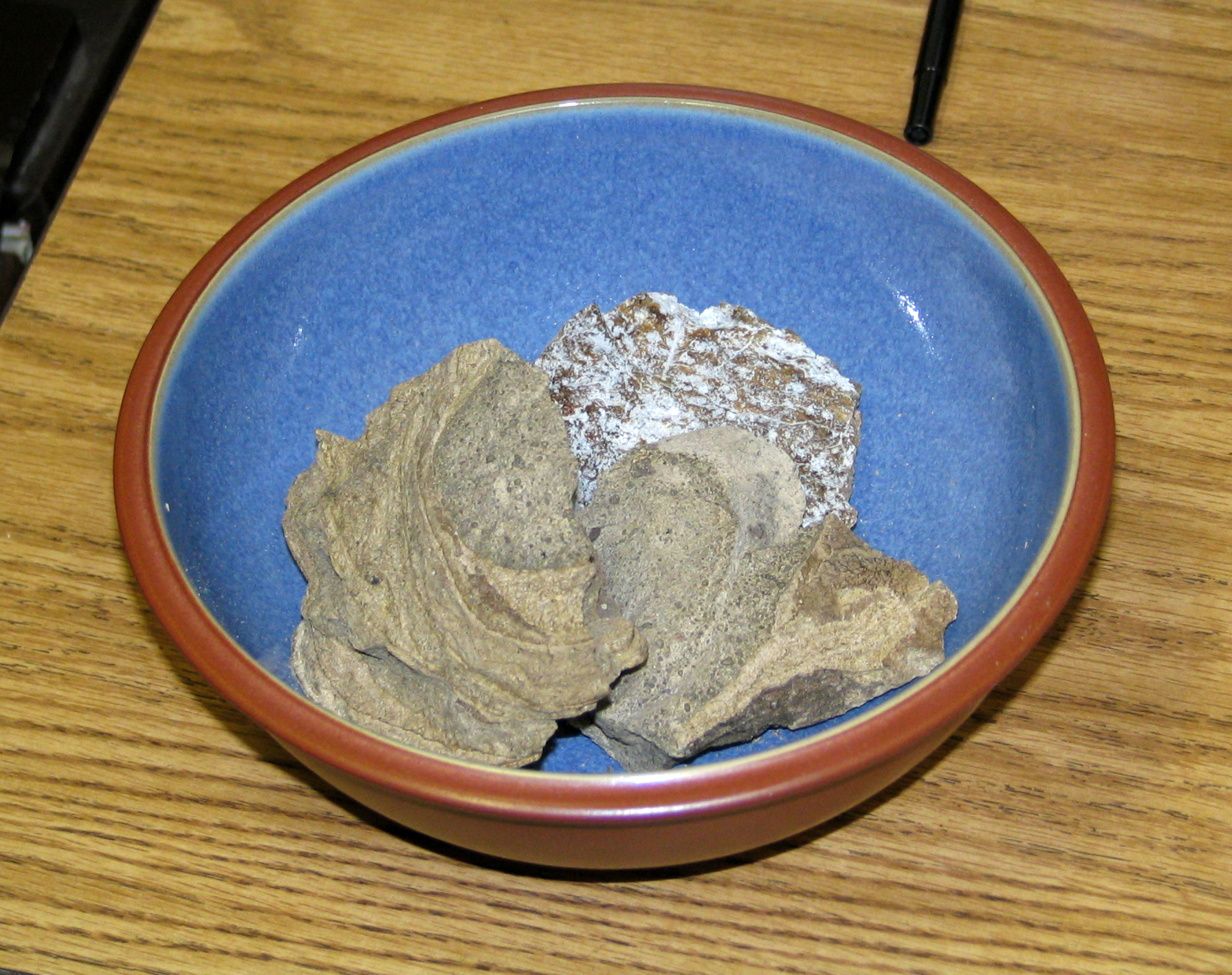
Ambergris

Ambergris is found in the gut of sperm whales. It is commonly used in Arab cultures as relief medication for headaches or as a performance enhancer. The derived chemical ambrein increases testosterone concentrations, triggering sexual desire and sexual behavior, but in animal studies only. Further research is needed to know the effects in humans.

=== Bufotenin ===
Bufotenin is found in the skin and glands of toads belonging to the genus Bufo. It is commonly used in the Caribbean and China. In the Caribbean, it is used as an aphrodisiac called 'Love Stone'; in China, it is used as a heart medication called Chan su. Research shows that the toad skin secretion containing this compound can reduce a toad’s heart rate, but its effect on humans is unknown.

=== Yohimbine ===
Yohimbine chemical structure

Yohimbine is a substance found in the bark of yohim trees in West Africa. It was traditionally used in West African cultures, in which the bark would be boiled and the resulting water drunk until it increased sexual desire. It is also found in over-the-counter health products. Yohimbine is an indole alkaloid and is an adrenoceptor antagonist. Known adverse effects include nausea, anxiety, irregular heartbeats, and restlessness.

=== Horny goat weed ===
Horny goat weed (Epimedii herba) is used in Chinese folk medicine. It was thought to be useful for treating medical conditions and improving sexual desire, sexual pleasure, and/or sexual behavior. Horny goat weed contains icariin, a flavanol glycoside. Its exotic name comes from the tendency of goats in the region to seek out this weed. Once farmers saw its effects on the goat population they began to use it to increase the number of workers on their farms.

=== Alcohol ===
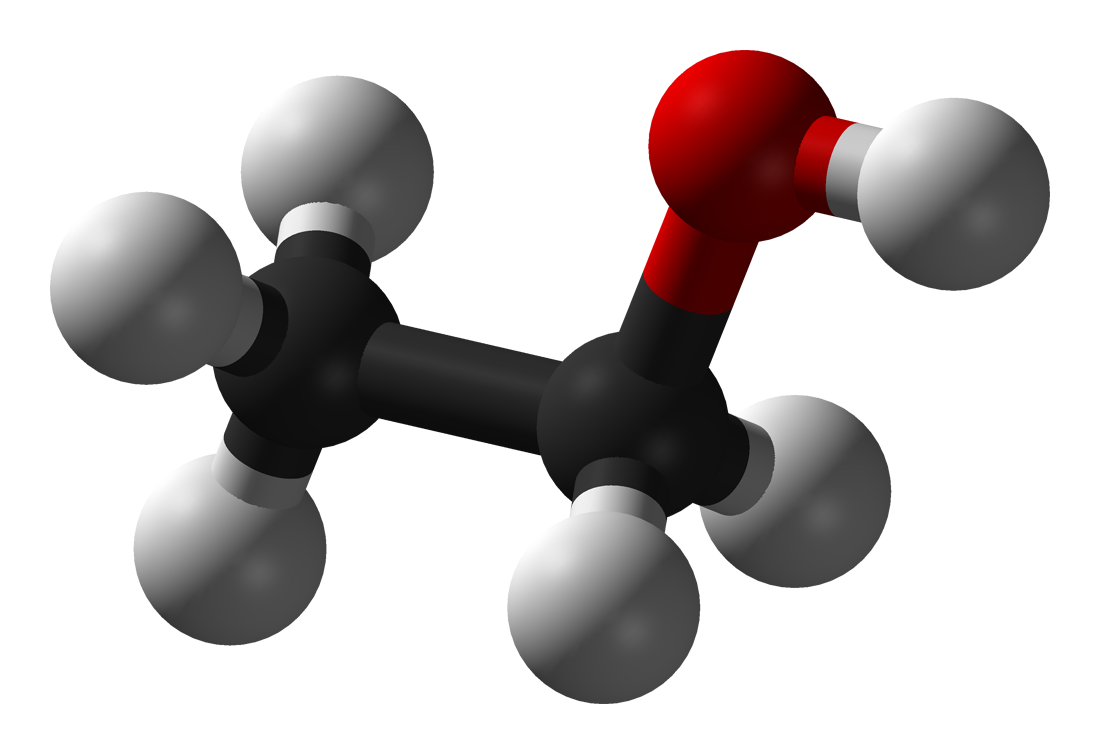
A molecule of alcohol

Alcohol has traditionally been viewed as possessing aphrodisiac-like qualities owing to its effect as a central nervous system depressant, as depressants can increase sexual desire and sexual behavior through disinhibition. Alcohol affects people both physiologically and psychologically, and it is therefore difficult to determine exactly how people experience its aphrodisiac effects (aphrodisiac qualities or the expectancy effect). Alcohol taken in moderate quantities can elicit a positive increase in sexual desire, whereas larger quantities are associated with difficulties in reaching sexual pleasure. Chronic alcohol consumption is related to sexual dysfunction.

=== Cannabis ===
Marijuana reports are mixed. Half of users claim an increase in sexual desire and sexual pleasure while the other half report no effect. Consumption, individual sensitivity, and possibly marijuana strain, are factors that affect outcomes.

=== Food ===
Many cultures have turned to foods as sources of increasing sexual desire; however, significant research is lacking in the study of the aphrodisiac qualities of foods. Most claims can be linked to the placebo effect. Misconceptions revolve around the visual appearance of these foods in relation to male and female genitalia (carrots, bananas, oysters, and the like). Other beliefs arise from the thought of consuming animal genitalia and absorbing their properties (e.g. cow cod soup in Jamaica and balut in the Philippines). Korean bug is a popular aphrodisiac in China, Korea, and Southeast Asia, either eaten alive or in gelatin form. The caterpillar fungus (Ophiocordyceps sinensis) is used as an aphrodisiac in China. The story of Aphrodite, who was born from the sea, is another reason why individuals believe seafood is another source of aphrodisiacs. Foods that contain volatile oils have gained little recognition in their ability to improve sexual desire, sexual pleasure, and/or sexual behavior, because they are irritants when released through the urinary tract. Chocolate has been reported to increase sexual desire in women who consume it over those who do not. Cloves and sage have been reported to demonstrate aphrodisiac qualities, but their effects have not been specified. Tropical fruits, such as Borojó and Chontaduro, are considered to be energizers in general and sexual energizers in particular.

=== Ginseng ===
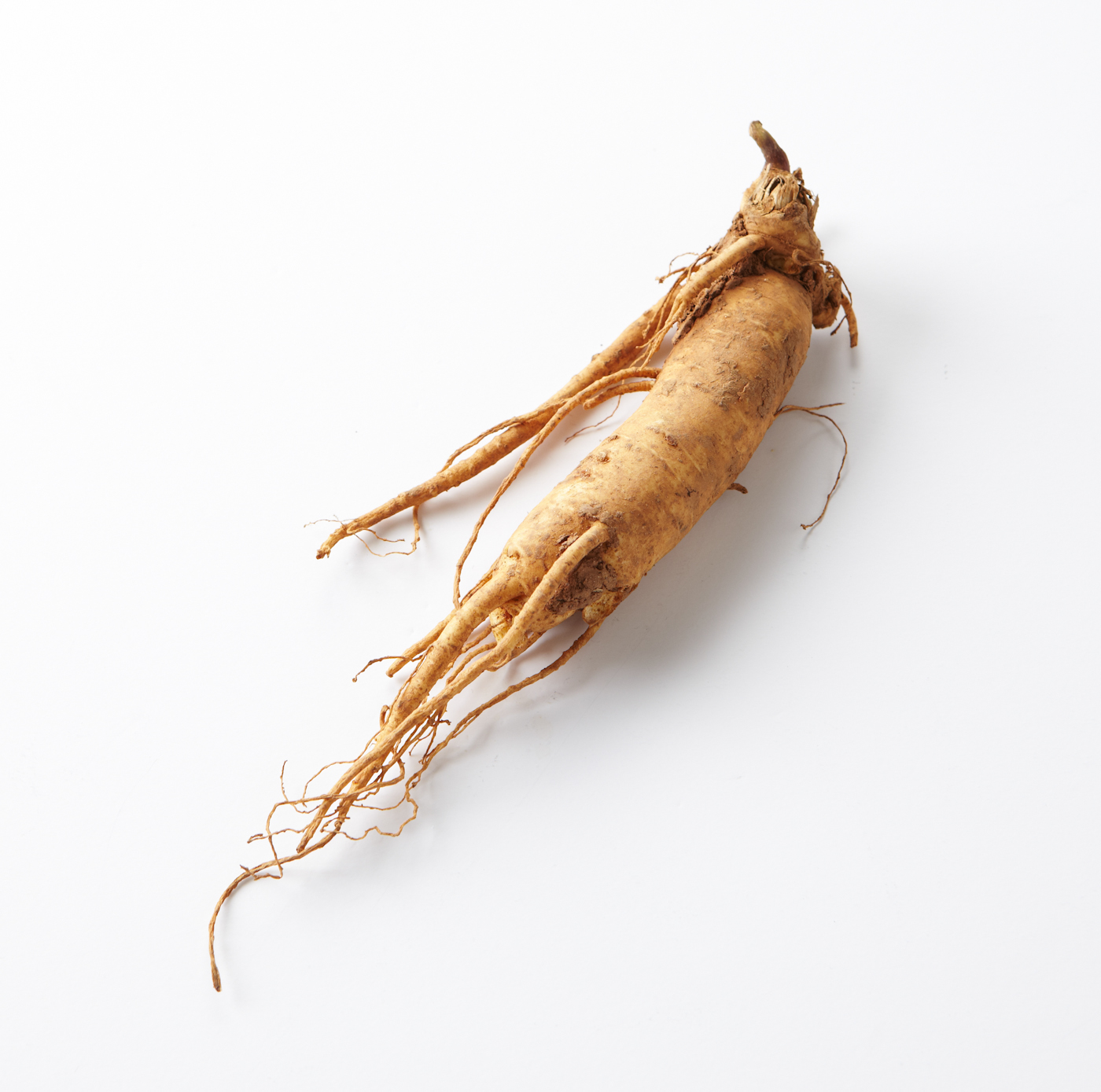
Ginseng

Ginseng is the root of any member of the genus Panax. Ginseng's active ingredients are ginsenosides and saponin glycosides. There are three different ways of processing ginseng. Fresh ginseng is cut at four years of growth, white ginseng is cut at four to six years of growth, and red ginseng is cut, dried, and steamed at six years of growth. Red ginseng has been reported to be the most effective aphrodisiac of the three. Known adverse effects include mild gastrointestinal upsets.

=== Synthetic aphrodisiacs ===
MDMA molecule, the compound found in Ecstasy

Popular party substances have been reported by users to consist of aphrodisiac properties because of their enhancing effects with sexual pleasure. Ecstasy users have reported an increase in sexual desire and sexual pleasure; however, there have been reports of delayed orgasm in both sexes and erectile difficulties in men. Poppers, containing drugs for inhalation, have been linked to increased sexual pleasure. Known adverse effects are headaches, nausea, and temporary erectile difficulties.

==== Phenethylamines ====
Amphetamine, methylphenidate, and methamphetamine are phenethylamine derivatives, which increase libido and cause frequent or prolonged erections as potential adverse effects, particularly in supratherapeutic doses, when sexual hyperexcitability and hypersexuality can occur; however, in some individuals who use these drugs, libido is reduced. 2C-B was sold commercially in 5 mg pills as a purported aphrodisiac under the trade name "Erox", which was manufactured by the German pharmaceutical company Drittewelle.

==== Testosterone ====
Libido in males is linked to concentrations of sex hormones, particularly testosterone. When there is reduced sex drive in individuals with relatively low concentrations of testosterone, particularly in postmenopausal women or men over the age of 60, dietary supplements that are purported to increase serum testosterone concentrations have been used, with the intention of increasing libido, although with limited benefits. Long-term therapy with synthetic oral testosterone is associated with increased risks of cardiovascular diseases.

== Risks ==
Solid evidence is hard to obtain, as these substances come from many different environments cross-culturally and therefore give variable results, because of variations in growth and extraction. The same is also true for unnatural substances, because variations in consumption and individual sensitivity can affect outcomes. Folk medicine and self-prescribed methods can be potentially harmful, as their adverse effects are not fully known and are therefore not made aware to the people searching this topic on the internet.

== See also ==
- Pheromone
- Endorphins
- Anaphrodisiac
- Date rape drug
- Entactogen
- Food and sexuality
- Fork Me, Spoon Me, 2006 book
- Hypersexuality
- Hypoactive sexual desire disorder
- List of investigational sexual dysfunction drugs
- Love potion
- Phytoestrogen
- Phytoandrogen
- Androgens
- Estrogens
- Viagra
- Vyleesi

== General and cited references ==
- Gabriele Froböse, Rolf Froböse, Michael Gross (Translator): Lust and Love: Is It More than Chemistry? Royal Society of Chemistry, 2006; ISBN 0-85404-867-7.
- Michael Scott: Pillow Talk: A Comprehensive Guide to Erotic Hypnosis and Relyfe Programming. Blue Deck Press, 2011; ISBN 0-98341-640-0.
