= Vent pecking =

Bird behaviour

Vent pecking is an abnormal behaviour of birds performed primarily by commercial egg-laying hens. It is characterised by pecking damage to the cloaca, the surrounding skin and underlying tissue. Vent pecking frequently occurs immediately after an egg has been laid when the cloaca often remains partly everted exposing the mucosa, red from the physical trauma of oviposition or bleeding if the tissue is torn by her laying an egg. Vent pecking clearly causes pain and distress to the bird being pecked. Tearing of the skin increases susceptibility to disease and may lead to cannibalism, with possible evisceration of the pecked bird and ultimately, death.

== Prevalence and severity ==
Surveys [verification of survey specifications needed e.g. sampling size] have shown that 27% of farmers reported seeing damage to the vents of their hens and 36.9% of farmers reported vent pecking had occurred in their previous flock. Whilst farmers attributed 1.3% of mortalities as due to vent pecking the most common findings at autopsy were different types of cannibalism (65.51%), with vent cannibalism (38.57%) the most common. The type of housing system markedly affects the prevalence of vent pecking with 22.5% of hens affected in free-range systems, 10.0% in barn systems, 6.2% in conventional cages and 1.6% in furnished cages, with a similar rank for the severity of vent pecking injuries.

== Causation ==
The causes and development of vent pecking are multifarious.

Risk factors that have been identified as increasing vent pecking include dim lights placed in nest boxes to encourage hens to use the boxes, the diet being changed more than three times during the egg laying period, the use of bell drinkers, and the hens beginning to lay earlier than 20 weeks of age. Vent pecking is associated with indicators of stress, e.g. fluctuating asymmetry, heterophil to lymphocyte ratio, and tonic immobility duration. Vent pecking can be related to disease or immune challenge as it sometimes becomes prevalent in cases of Gumboro disease (infectious bursal disease) and is increased by challenges with the protein antigen, human serum albumin (HuSA). Housing design can influence vent pecking. Mortality caused by cannibalism was reduced when hens had sufficient room to perch all facing the feed trough, thus giving their perch-mates little opportunity to peck at the vent region. and increased pecking activity and cannibalistic behaviour can occur due to inadequate height of the perches. Larger group sizes lead to increases in vent pecking suggesting that social learning plays a role.

== See also ==
- Abnormal behaviour of birds in captivity
- Feather pecking
- Cannibalism (poultry)
- Toe pecking
- Chicken
- Poultry farming
- Battery cages
