= Cannibalism in poultry =

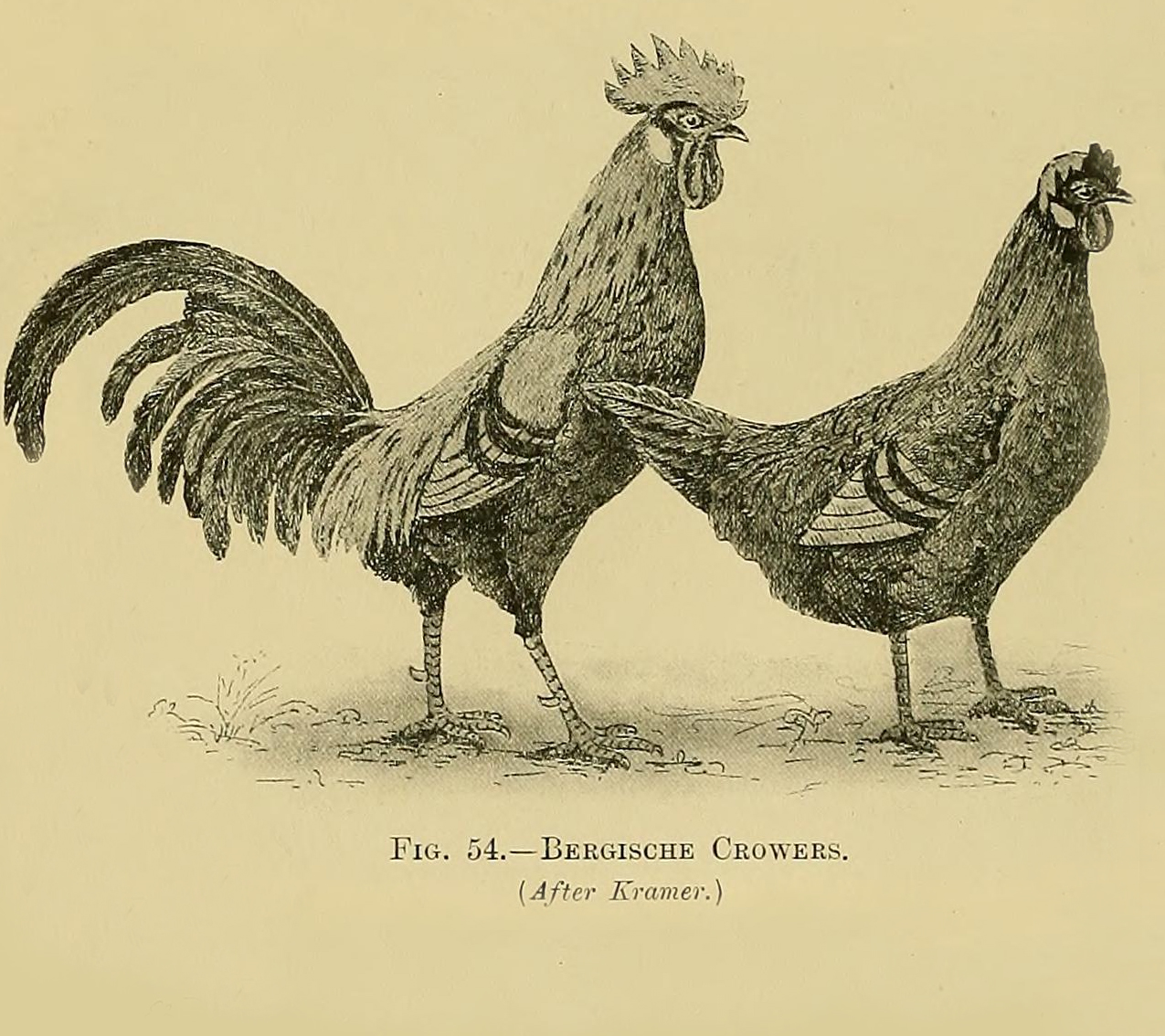
Image of domesticated poultry

Cannibalism in poultry is the act of one individual of a poultry species consuming all or part of another individual of the same species as food. It occurs commonly in flocks of domestic hens reared for egg production, although it can also occur in domestic turkeys, pheasants and other poultry species. Poultry create a social order of dominance known as pecking order. When pressure occurs within the flock, pecking can increase in aggression and escalate to cannibalism. Cannibalism can occur as a consequence of feather pecking which has caused denuded areas and bleeding on a bird's skin. Cannibalism can cause large mortality rates within the flock and large decreases in production due to the stress it causes. Vent pecking, sometimes called 'cloacal cannibalism', is considered to be a separate form of cannibalistic pecking as this occurs in well-feathered birds and only the cloaca is targeted. There are several causes that can lead to cannibalism, such as: light and overheating, crowd size, nutrition, injury, death, genetics and learned behaviour. Research has been conducted to attempt to understand why poultry engage in this behaviour, as it is not totally understood. There are known methods of control to reduce cannibalism, such as crowd size control, beak trimming, light manipulation, perches, selective genetics and eyewear.

== Motivational basis ==
Poultry species which exhibit cannibalism are omnivores. For example, hens in the wild often scratch at the soil to search for seeds, insects and even larger animals such as lizards or young mice, although they are mainly herbivorous in adulthood. Feather pecking is often the initial cause of an injury which then attracts the cannibalistic pecking of other birds – perhaps as re-directed foraging or feeding behaviour. In the close confines of modern farming systems, the increased pecking attention is easily observed by multiple birds which join in the attack, and often the escape attempts of the cannibalised bird attract more pecking attention.

== Causes ==
=== Light and overheating ===
High intensity light with prolonged exposure can lead to cannibalism of poultry in captivity due to the increase of stress and overheating that causes discomfort.

=== Crowd size ===
Poultry have a social hierarchy. When crowds are too close together, dominant birds will fight more often to obtain or sustain dominance, which can increase risk of cannibalism. The increased crowd size also plays into a few more factors. With a larger crowd there is less space in the pen. This allows for less feeding space which therefore means that dominant birds will take majority of the food supply leaving less dominant birds susceptible to becoming underweight and easier targets to the dominant birds for cannibalism. An optimal flock size are either large flock of greater than 30 where the group is too large to recognize an established dominant bird and the social hierarchy breaks down, or a small group size where a social order can easily organize itself. Intermediate group sizes cause confusion among the flock and leads to higher aggression of different birds attempting to become the dominant one and therefore leading to increased risk of cannibalism.

=== Nutrition ===
A particular diet of low protein but high energy is shown to lead to less aggressive behaviours, but despite that, a diet lacking the protein component (amino acid) methionine is shown to cause aggressive behaviours. Methionine is an essential amino acid. This means the body cannot produce the amino acid and needs an external source to obtain its required amount. Oftentimes in flocks it is the first limiting amino acids. Methionine contains sulfur, which is necessary to grow feathers and this may explain the biological purpose for increased pecking. This pecking behavior then escalates into more extreme forms of cannibalism.

Poultry have a gland called the preen gland that secretes an oily, salty tasting substance. When their diets lack salt, the gland produces the oily substances but without the salty taste. The bird then believes it is not getting its requirement from the gland and will peck at another bird's preen gland to meet their requirements. When the behaviour of pecking other birds is introduced, it can lead to increased risk of cannibalism.

When feeding, it is important to give enough space and to lay the feed to mimic the environmental conditions and spread the feed so poultry spend time pecking at the food and not each other.

Feather eating is another potential cause to cannibalism. Feather eating is a behaviour similar to feather pecking where poultry will peck at other members of the flock to eat their feathers. In a study of F2 cross of hens for aggressive pecking behaviour it was seen that feather eating during a chick's rearing stage of life meant it had a higher likelihood of feather pecking in the laying stage of its life. One reason they believed why feather eating was prevalent, is that keratin from feathers was not a nutritional source per se, but could enhance the gut microbiome.

=== Injury or death ===
Within a pen, if another bird is injured or dead, the sight of this can encourage other pen members to engage in cannibalistic behaviours. This is due to the social order created by poultry, as well as their attraction to blood. Poultry are attracted to the colour red and the sight of blood can cause them to be attracted to the injured bird and peck at it more to increase their rank in the pecking order. Sometimes this even leads to their death.

== Prevalence ==
Cannibalism among layer hen flocks is highly variable; when it is not problematic, mortalities among production systems are generally similar. Published data on the prevalence of cannibalism could be misleading due to the inclusion of vent-pecking by some researchers but not others. Mortalities, due mainly to cannibalism, can be up to 15% in egg-laying flocks housed in aviaries, straw yards, and free-range systems. Because egg-laying strains of chickens can be kept in smaller group sizes in cage systems, cannibalism is reduced, leading to a lowered trend in mortality as compared to non-cage systems. In a study which examined 'skin damage' (most of which would have been caused by pecking) on hens at the end of their productive lives, damage was lowest in hens from free range systems, followed by barns, then furnished cages, and highest in conventional or battery cages.

== Methods of control ==
=== Beak-trimming ===
Beak-trimming is the most common method of preventing or reducing injuries by cannibalism. In a three-year study of floor-housed laying hens, death by cannibalism was reported as 7% in beak-trimmed birds but was increased to 18% in non-trimmed birds. This method can be considered cruel as it causes acute and chronic pain to the bird. The beaks of poultry are highly sensitive to pain, touch, heat and pressure. They use their beaks to forage the ground. Trimming their beaks makes them lose their ability to sense the external world and could cause the formation of neuromas, which are bundles of severed nerve endings becoming exposed due to beak trimming.

=== Group size ===
Increased group sizes in larger cages or floor systems can elevate the risk of cannibalism and feather pecking, probably due to the spread of the behaviour through social learning.

=== Light manipulations ===
Lights are sometimes provided in nest-boxes to attract hens to use the nests. However, this practice has been correlated with an increased risk of cannibalism.

=== Perches ===
Rearing chicks with access to perches by four weeks of age has been associated with increased use of perches, and reduced cannibalism, in adulthood.

=== Selective breeding and genetics ===
A sibling-selection programme has genetically selected a low mortality line which shows decreased mortality from cannibalism compared to a control line.

=== Eyewear ===
Cannibalism may be reduced by fitting hens with a range of eyewear. Rose-tinted glasses or contact lenses have been used. Opaque spectacles, or blinders, have also been used. For both spectacles and blinders, there are versions held in place by circlips in the nares of the bird, or others in which a pin pierces the nasal septum. The piercing method is illegal in the UK. It is theorized that—as with placing red filters over windows, or keeping the birds in red light—the coloured lenses prevent the birds from recognising the blood or raw flesh of other hens, thereby diminishing cannibalistic behaviour.

== Nature vs. nurture ==
While cannibalism of poultry is a learned behaviour, there is a genetic component that can make the bird be more susceptible to engaging or initiating cannibalism.

=== Nature ===
Pecking and other forms of pecking (feather pecking, vent pecking, aggressive pecking) are normal behaviours that have genetic influences One study in the Netherlands tested if a specific farming style had an effect on cannibalism. During the study they estimated the heredity of feather pecking to be as high as 0.56. Another study found that brown-egg laying hens are more likely to engage in feather pecking than white-egg laying hens. The genetics of poultry will not guarantee a bird will engage in cannibalism, but the genes a bird possesses play a part in the degree of aggressiveness a bird could engage in feather pecking and increases their risk engaging in cannibalism.

Certain genetic technologies such as linkage analysis could identify genes related to feather pecking and could be screened against to select birds that are less likely to engage in pecking. However, one study found a correlation between feather pecking and egg production and found that birds that engage in high feather-pecking behaviour had on average had a higher egg production. Therefore, selecting against feather pecking could reduce egg production. Farmers would have to choose between a trade off of either possibly having higher egg production with a high potential of flock death due to cannibalism, versus lower egg production with a lower risk of death due to cannibalism.

=== Nurture ===
Pecking and feather pecking are normal behaviours, but cannibalism can be learned. Feather eating is also a normal behaviour that can lead the bird into engaging in feather pecking. As a chick during rearing engages in feather eating, they are more likely to engage in feather pecking during the "laying" stage of their lives. Furthermore, if a member of the flock has had its feather pecked, they will stay in this category as the damage to the feathers are a physical indicator to others that that bird is being targeted. One study found that fear could increase feather pecking and primary cannibals can influence secondary cannibals by initiating cannibalism by becoming more aggressive in pecking. Cannibalism within a flock is seen as a chain reaction where if one member of the flock begins, if left unattended, will cause others around it to learn the behaviour and engage in cannibalism. The social order of a flock will also play into the risk of cannibalism. This can be seen if a primary cannibal is a higher ranked bird in the flock, it could influence more secondary cannibals and spread this behaviour more rapidly.

=== Genotype-environmental interaction ===
While genetics and learned experience can influence behaviour, it is ultimately an interaction of the two that gives the expressed behaviour. The Netherlands study found the flocks of the same breed had different outcomes of whether cannibalism developed or not depending on the management control of the different farms the flocks grew up in. While the genetics of these flocks were similar, the environmental factors ultimately influences the introduction of cannibalism in the flocks. In some flocks, 36.4% of the deaths due to cannibalism was observed. To minimize cannibalism in domesticated poultry, different approaches such as ecology, environmental physiology, epidemiology, molecular genetics and ethology have been taken. However, the approach with the most success was the molecular genetic with behavioural research. This could lead to the decline of server practices to reduce cannibalism such as beak trimming.

== See also ==
- Animal cannibalism
- Abnormal behaviour of birds in captivity
- Battery cages
- Chicken
- Feather pecking
- Furnished cages
- Poultry farming
- Savaging
- Toe pecking
- Vent pecking
