= Comfort behaviour in animals =

Animal behavior to maintain health and comfort

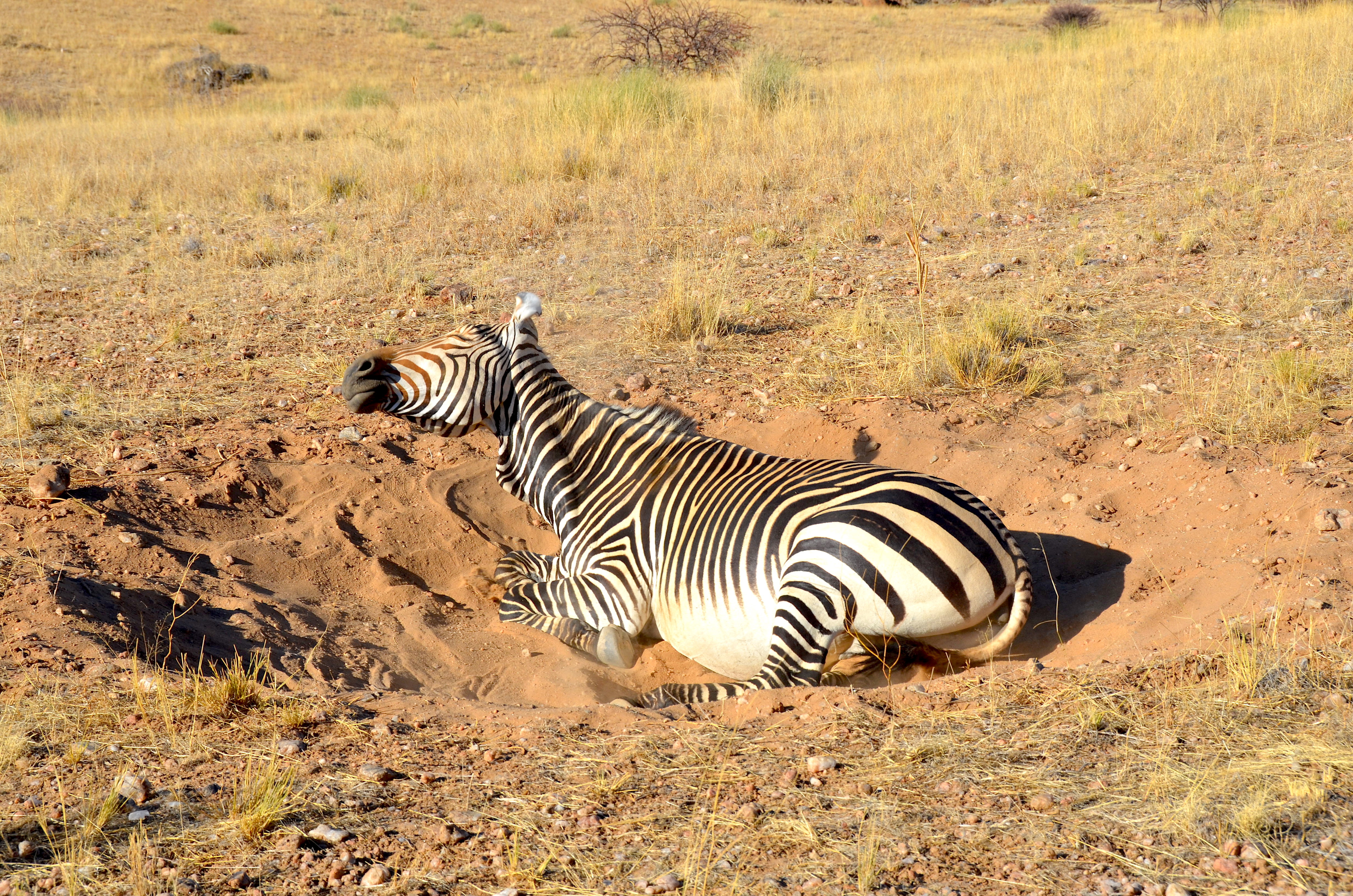
Dust bathing mountain zebra in Namibia

Comfort behaviors in animals are actions that contribute to the maintenance of their pelage, feathers, integument, or musculoskeletal system, enhancing overall physical well-being and comfort.

Comfort behaviors are exhibited from an early age and remain largely consistent throughout an animal's development. Certain comfort behaviors are associated with the onset of a rest period, such as grooming, while others, like stretching, occur at the end of rest, potentially serving to prepare the body for activities such as escape or hunting. Certain comfort behaviors, such as dust bathing, are performed only when both internal and external stimuli are appropriate (see also sham dustbathing). Animals typically engage in comfort behaviors when not occupied with essential activities such as feeding, drinking, hunting, or escaping, leading to their classification as luxury activities. However, some comfort behaviors, like dust bathing in hens, can be highly motivated, and restrictions on these behaviors—such as those imposed by battery cages—are considered detrimental to animal welfare.

== Purpose ==
Comfort behaviors serve various adaptive and functional purposes across a wide range of animal species. One primary function is hygiene, particularly through the removal of ectoparasites, which helps maintain the health and well-being of the animal. Animals remove ectoparasites by scratching or brushing their own bodies, or the grooming of others, which helps maintain skin and coat health while reducing irritation and parasite load. Through licking and brushing, animals such as the red squirrel clean wounds and remove dirt and debris from their bodies, also aiding in hygiene. Other physical purposes for comfort behaviours includes reduction in heart rates as seen in horses, and thermoregulation.

Comfort behaviors also serve reproductive purposes in various animal species. In some cases, these behaviors play a role in mate selection, as seen in wrens, where reciprocal and continuous preening strengthens pair bonds and facilitates mating. Similarly, in chickens, dust bathing occurs as female sexual behaviour. During gestation, grooming and licking of areas critical for reproduction - including the nipples, genitals, and pelvis - is increased in rats. Rabbits engage in grooming to maintain hygiene, remove loose fur, and strengthen social bonds. Stretching after rest improves a rabbit's circulation, flexibility, and readiness for quick movement, contributing to their overall well-being. Finally, in cats, a mother cat cares for her newly born kittens through comfort behaviours, licking and rubbing the kitten's head.

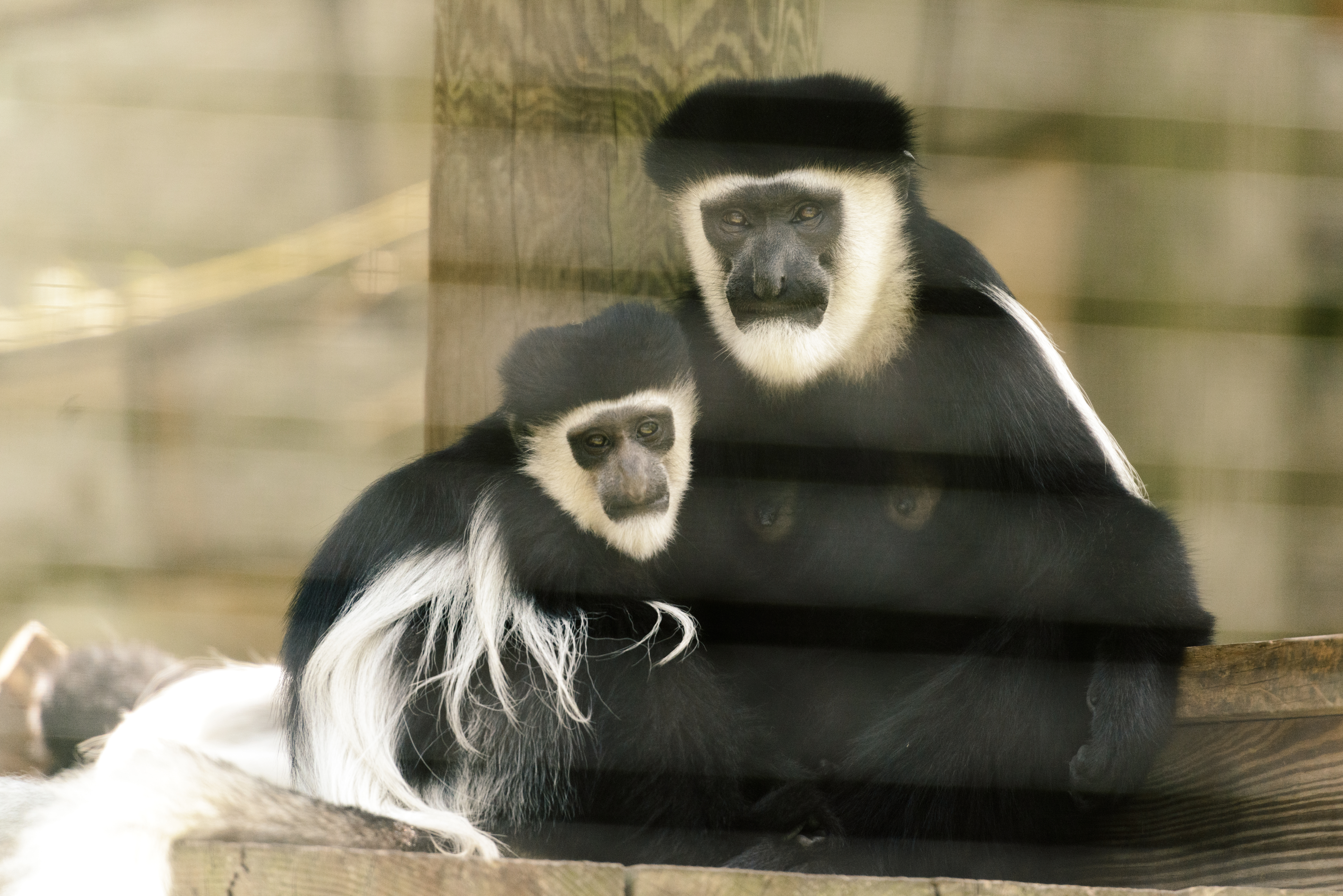
Mother monkey hugs her baby creating contact comfort.

Comfort behaviours can function to communicate socially during breeding season, such as in the Degus, and form bonds and social structure within groups. It also can have implications on social outcomes of an animal. In infant monkeys, it was found that contact comfort from their mothers was necessary to encourage positive social outcomes. The monkeys without these comfort behaviours developed fear and anxiety. This comfort behaviour has an important impact because in the absence of a mother, juvenile monkeys cling to each other for contact comfort.

== Types ==
=== Autogrooming ===
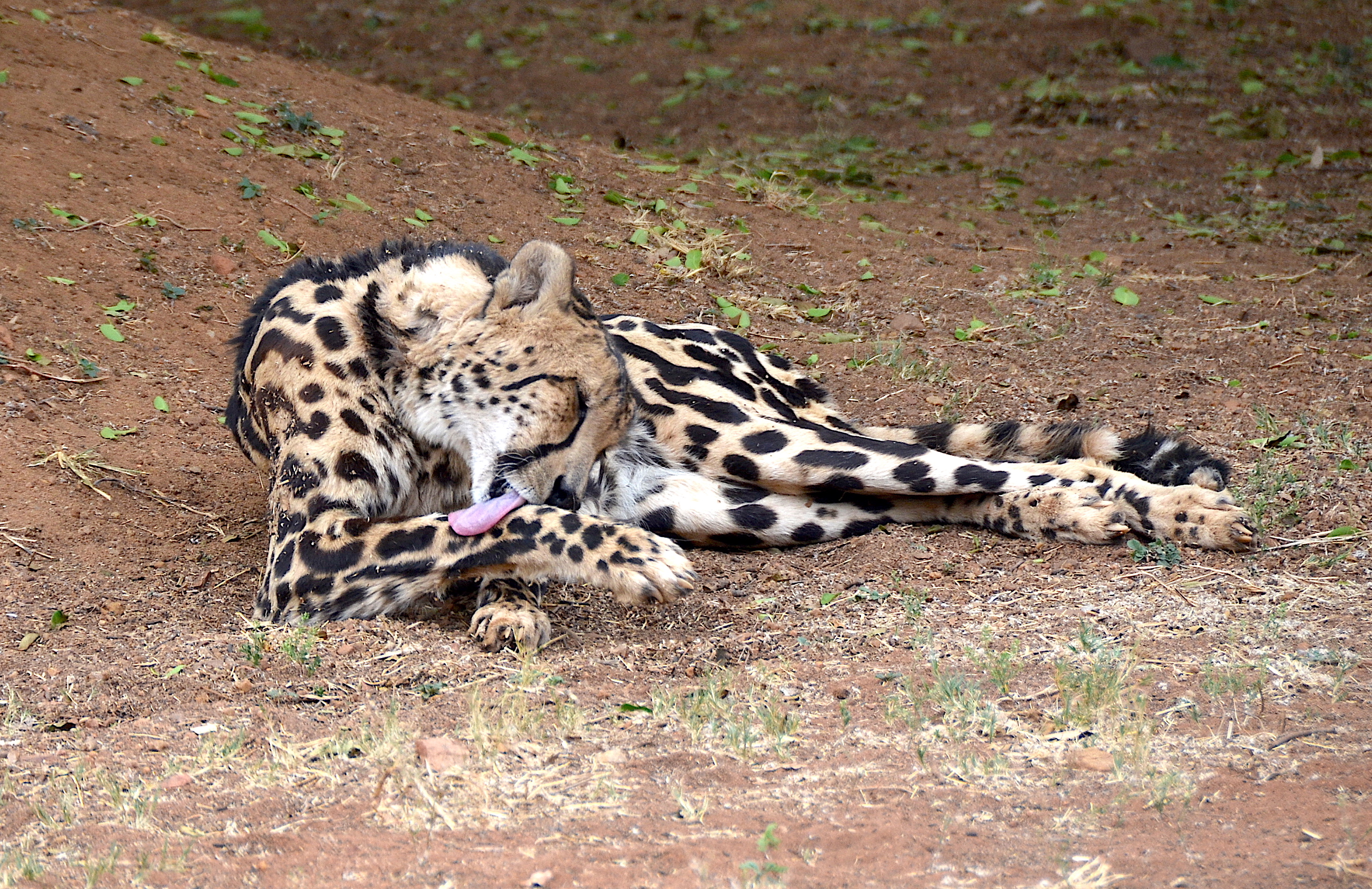
Grooming behaviour of a king cheetah

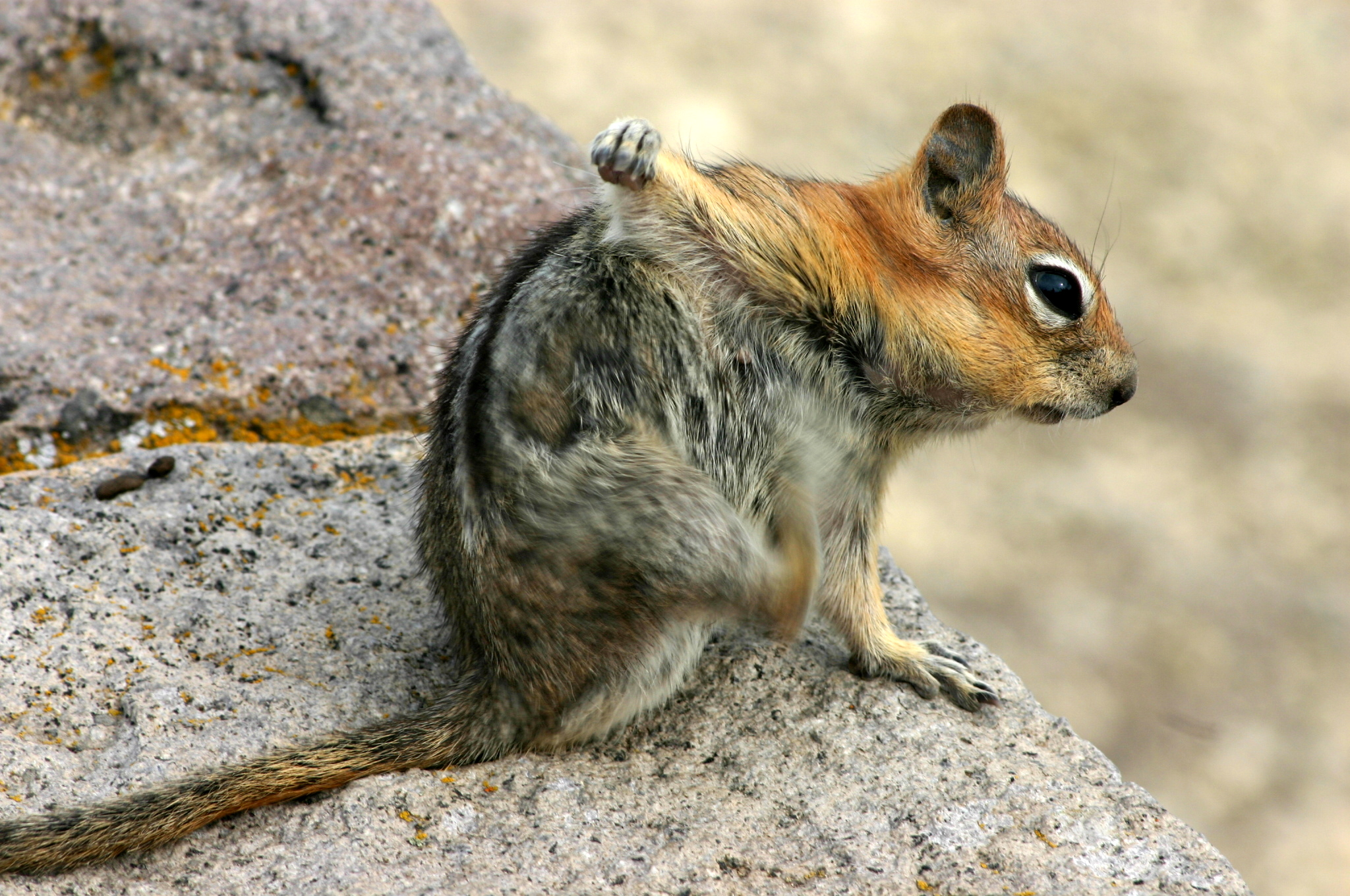
Squirrel scratching its armpit with its hindlimb claws – a process of autogrooming

Autogrooming, or self-grooming, refers to grooming behaviors an animal performs on its own body. This behavior commonly involves licking, chewing, clawing, and rubbing to maintain hygiene and physical well-being. This comfort behavior primarily serves hygienic purposes, as observed in the red squirrel. The red squirrel removes parasites and dirt by licking and chewing its fur, particularly on the tail, belly, and genitals, while using its claws to scratch harder-to-reach areas such as under the legs. It also brushes and rubs facial areas with its front paws and shakes its body or brushes against objects for additional cleaning. Self-grooming becomes more frequent in the spring when black fly populations increase in the environment. In certain animals, such as rats, autogrooming also serves reproductive purposes. During pregnancy, the frequency of grooming in critical reproductive areas, including the nipple lines, genitals, and pelvis, increases, while grooming in non-reproductive areas decreases. As pregnancy advances, the rate of licking in these essential areas continues to rise, likely supporting physiological changes and preparation for nursing.

=== Allogrooming ===
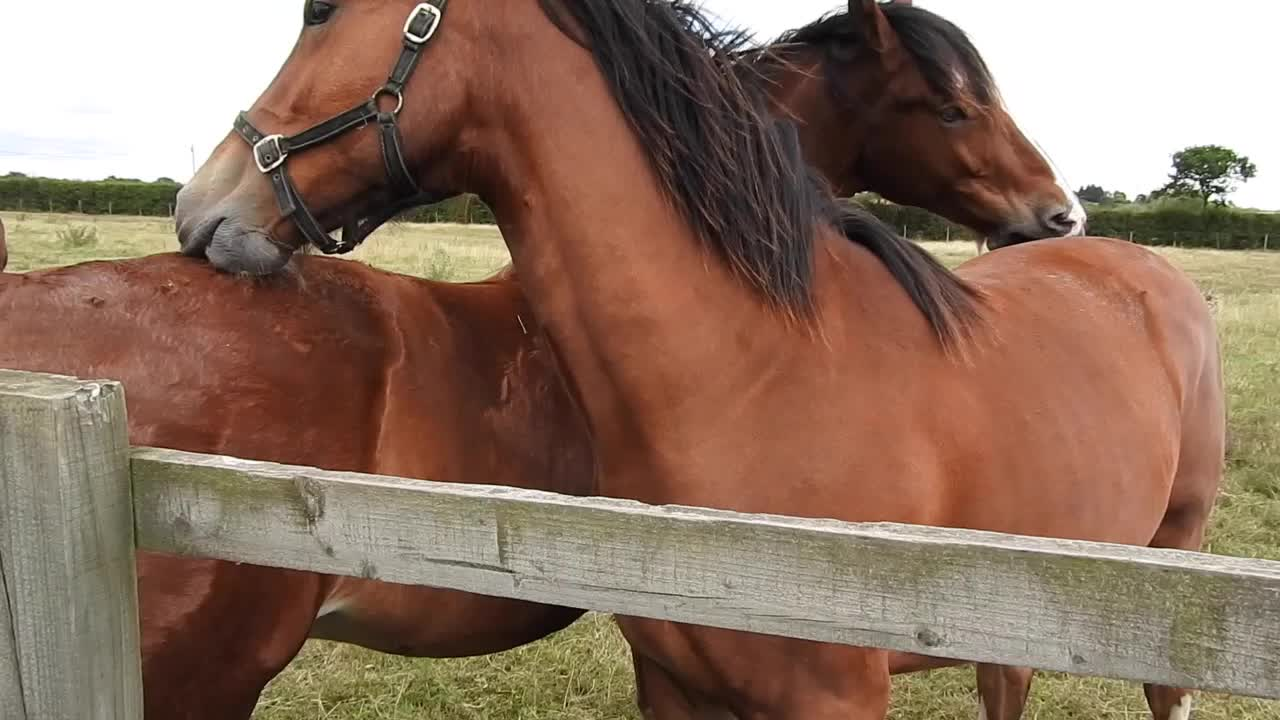
Horses grooming each other.

Allogrooming is grooming behaviour performed by one animal on another. This behaviour could include licking, rubbing or preening. Allogrooming can serve a reproductive function, as observed in wrens, where reciprocal preening initiated by either males or females plays a role in mate selection and bonding. Additionally, this comfort behaviour has a hygienic purpose as seen in red howlers and cats. In red howlers, individuals groom each other's bodies, including the neck, head, shoulders, and arms, to remove ectoparasites and maintain hygiene. Allopreening is similarly observed to have a social purpose in red howlers, showing that allogrooming has a variety of functions over a variety of species.

=== Maternal grooming ===
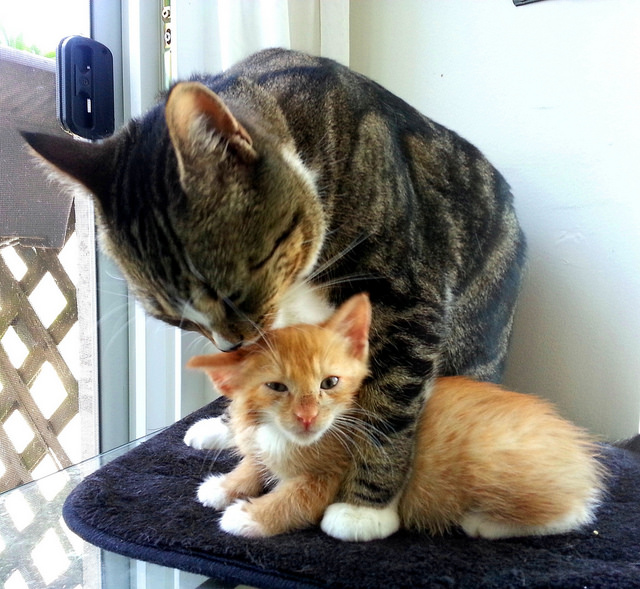
A mother cat licks the head of her kitten – a process of allogrooming.

In cattle, maternal grooming removes bacterial load and contributes to maintaining the body hygiene of the young animal. In domestic cats, mothers lick and rub their kittens' heads to maintain cleanliness. This maternal grooming later develops into a social behavior as kittens begin grooming their mothers in return. This reciprocal grooming strengthens social bonds and plays a vital role in group cohesion.

=== Bathing ===
Most bird species bathe using water, while others engage in dust bathing. Land birds exhibit seven distinct types of water bathing: "stand-in bathing," the most common method, involves standing in shallow water; "splash-bathing" occurs from land; "in-out bathing" involves repeated movements between land and water; "flight bathing" entails dipping while airborne; "plunge bathing" is done from a perch; "rain-bathing" utilizes falling rain; and "foliage-/dew-bathing" makes use of wet vegetation. Sea and water birds may employ these methods but can also bathe while swimming or diving. Bathing plays a crucial role in feather maintenance, oil distribution, removal of dirt, and thermoregulation. Among primates, the Japanese macaques of Jigokudani Monkey Park acquired the practice of hot-spring bathing for warmth.

A white-throated sparrow bathes in a shallow puddle

=== Dust bathing ===
Dust bathing is the process of an animal covering themselves, or bathing themselves in dust. In bobwhite quail, the dust bathing sequence follows a consistent pattern with minor variations. The quail begins by pecking at the dust before squatting in it, then uses its wings and feet to disperse the dust over its body, and finally shakes off the excess. This behavior is associated with feather maintenance, particularly the distribution of natural oils. Dust bathing also serves a reproductive function. In degus, males exhibit increased dust bathing frequency during the breeding season, likely to deposit scent marks that may deter rival males or attract potential mates. Conversely, dustbathing is frequent in female chickens as a part of reproductive behaviour.

House sparrows dust bathing

=== Wallowing ===
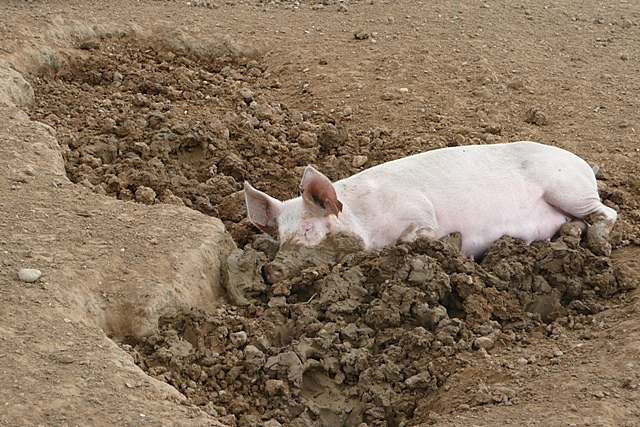
A pig wallowing in mud

Wallowing is characterized by the rolling or rubbing of an animal's body in mud or excrement (feces or urine). In red deer, wallowing involves kicking and pawing at mud, kneeling, and rolling in it. This behavior serves a strong social function by reinforcing hierarchy and group cohesion. Young deer initiate wallowing, attracting dominant individuals and fostering competition, which aids in their integration into the group. Additionally, wallowing often occurs before group activities, promoting synchronization and collective behavior. In pigs, another function of wallowing is presented, thermoregulation. When presented with increased temperature and humidity, pigs will wallow to regulate their body temperature.

== Gallery ==
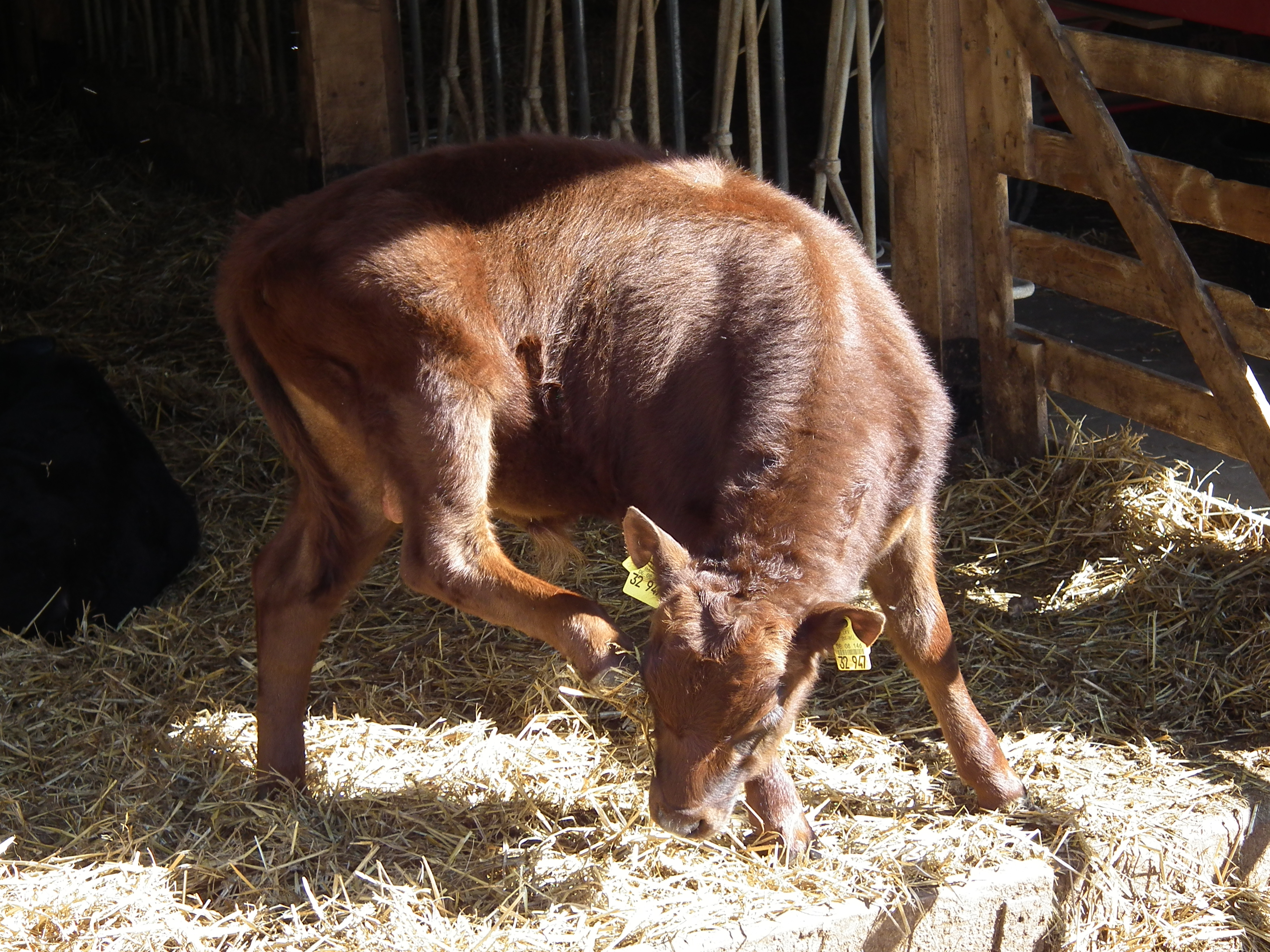
Scratching by a calf

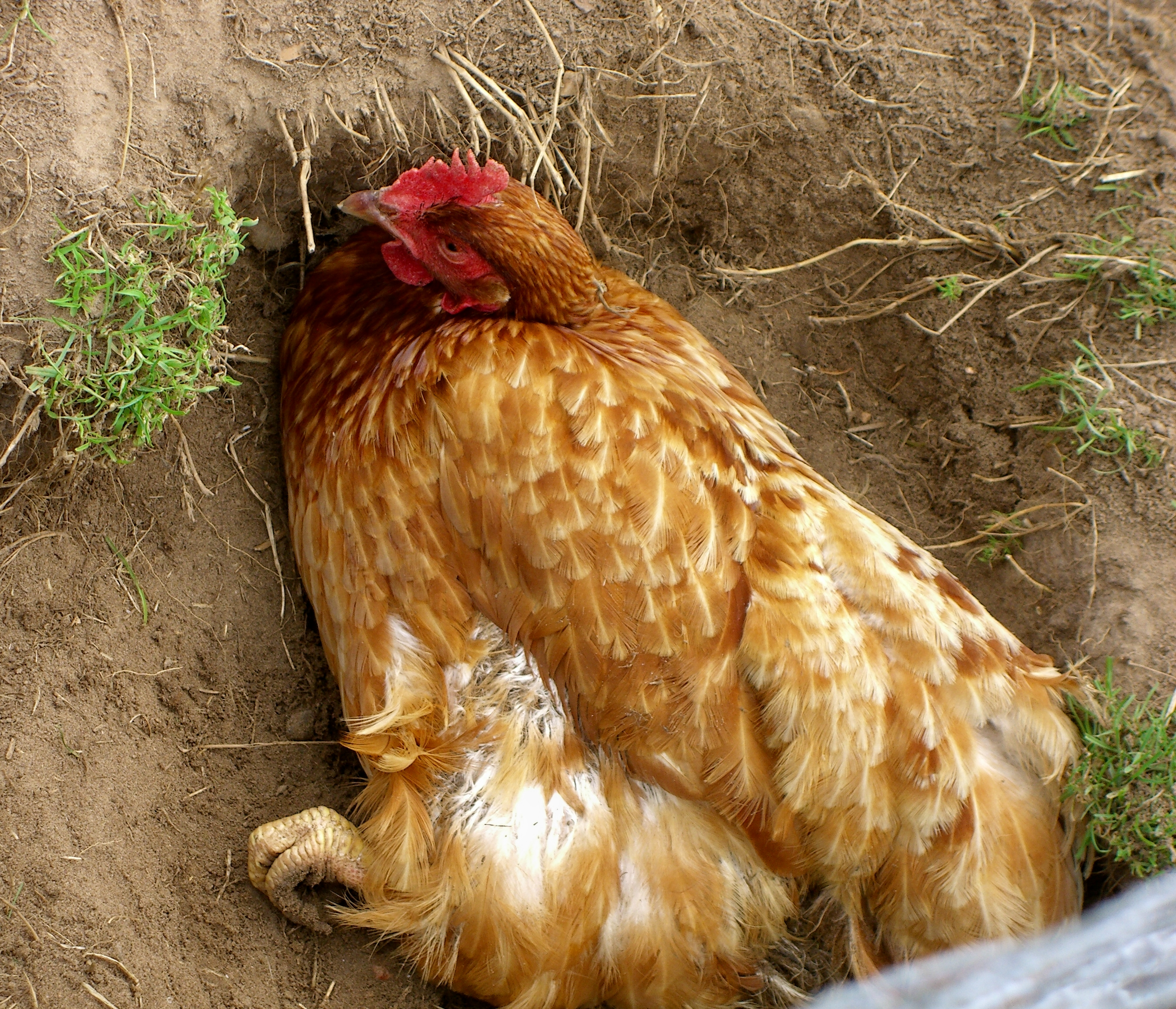
Dustbathing by a hen

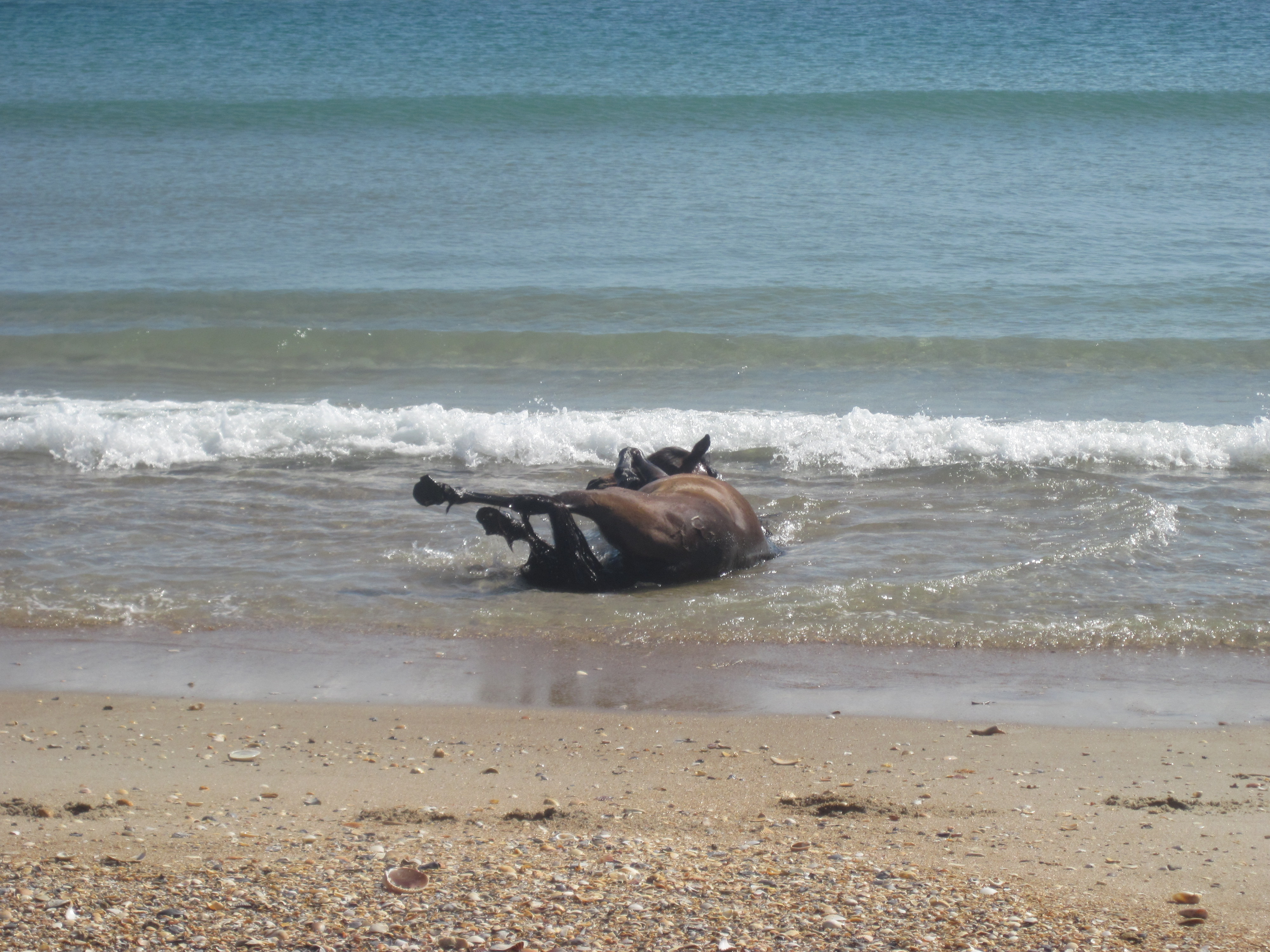
Rolling in water by a horse

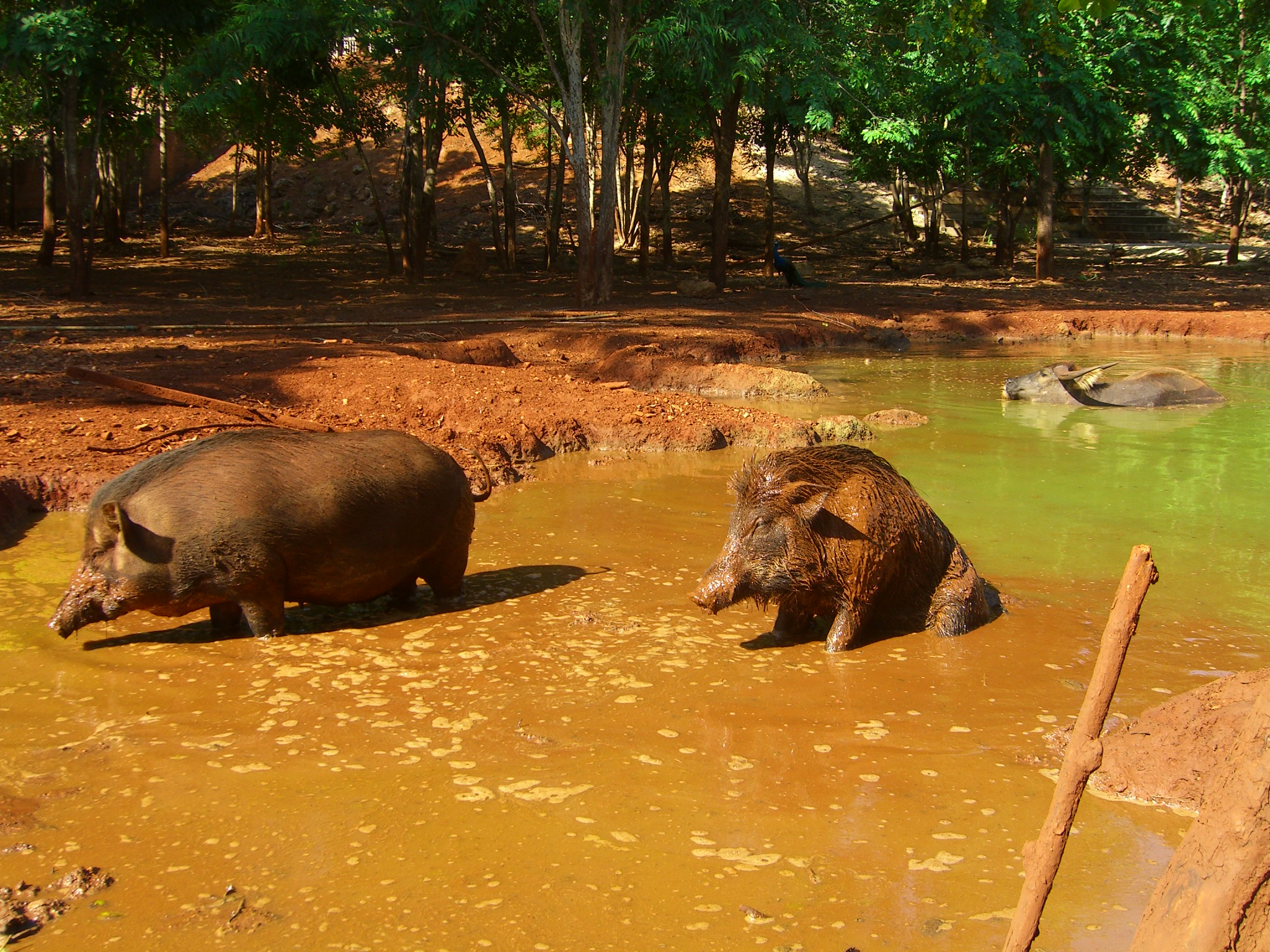
Wallowing by pigs

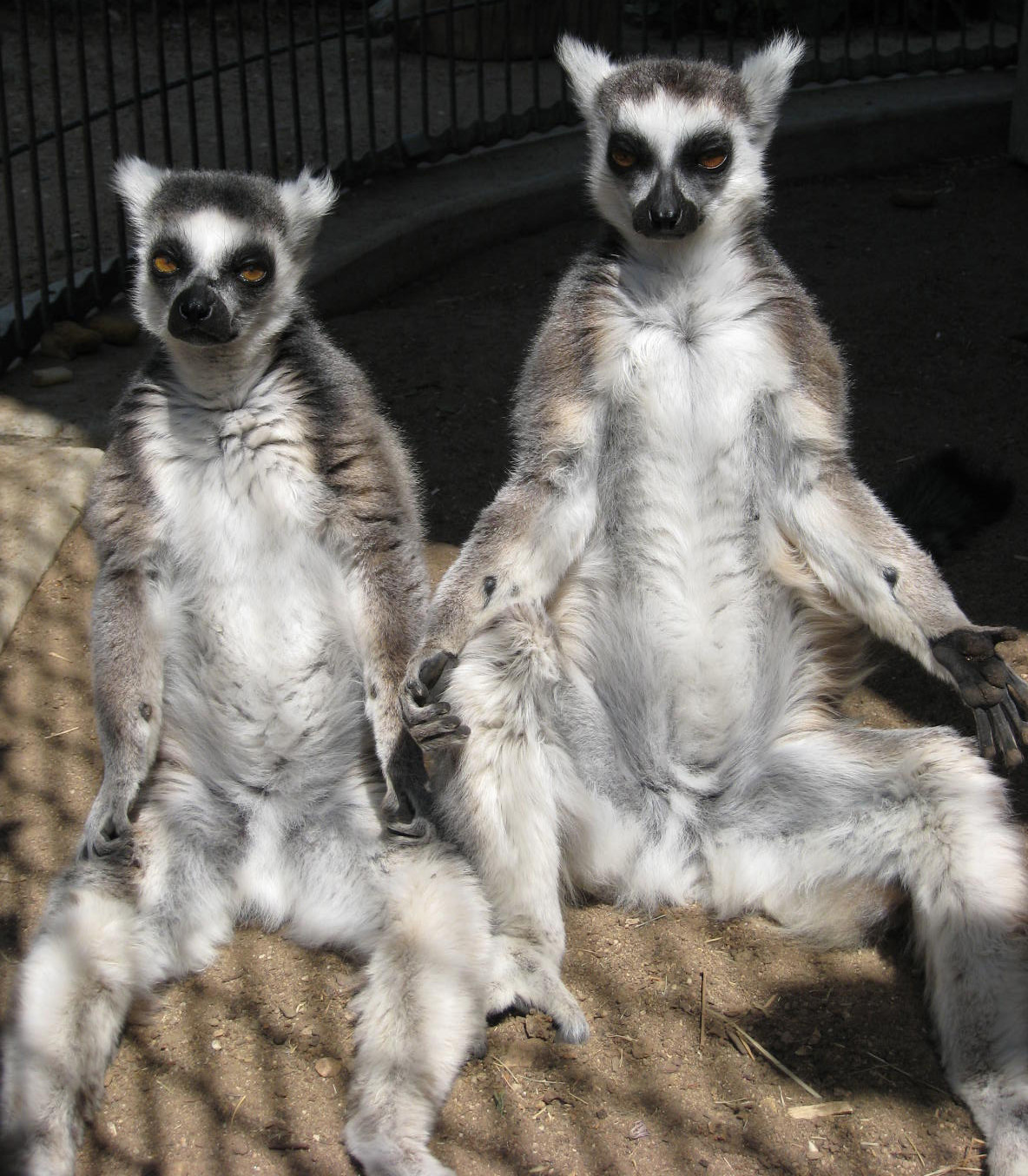
Sunbathing by lemurs

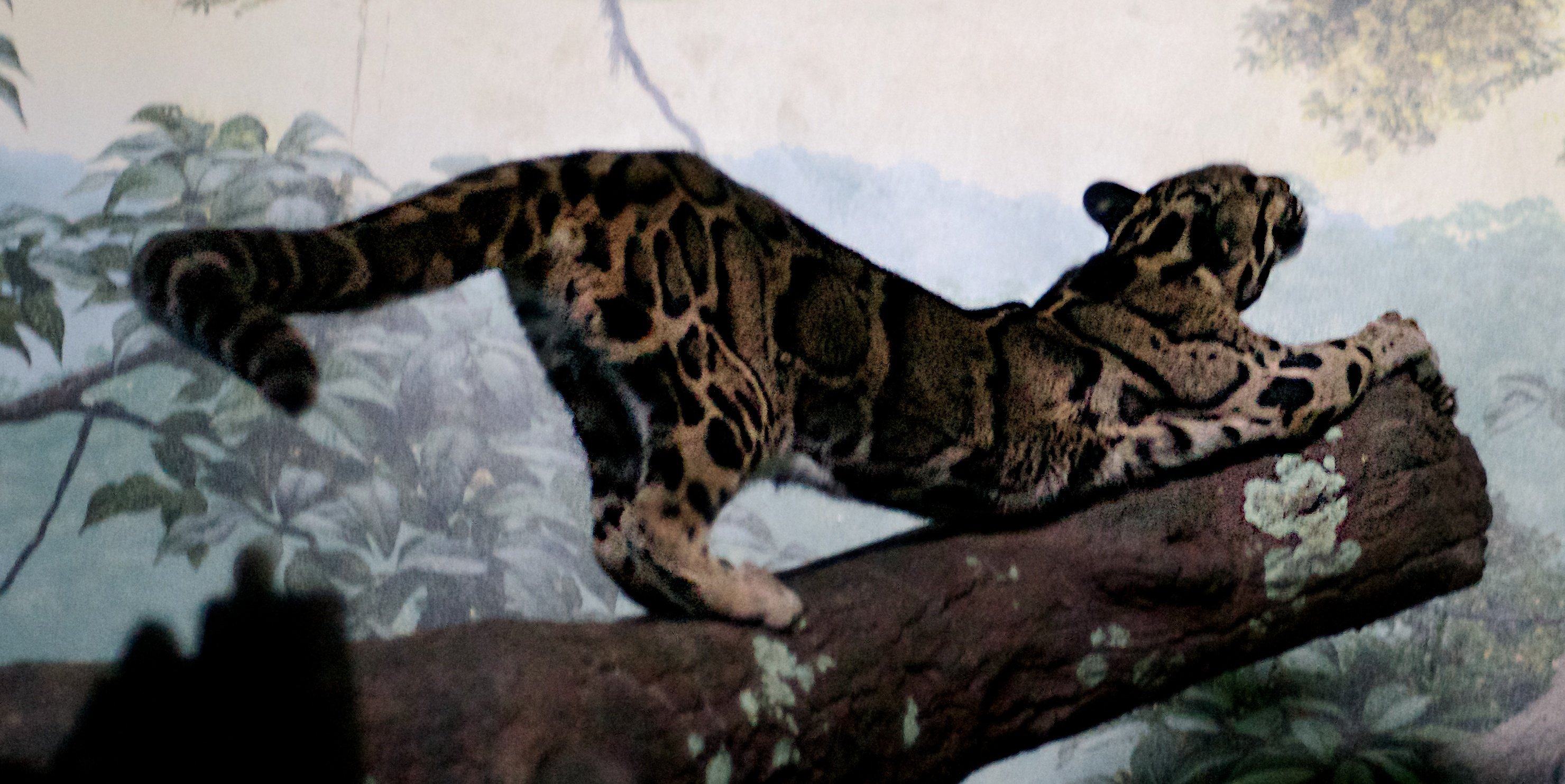
Stretching by a clouded leopard

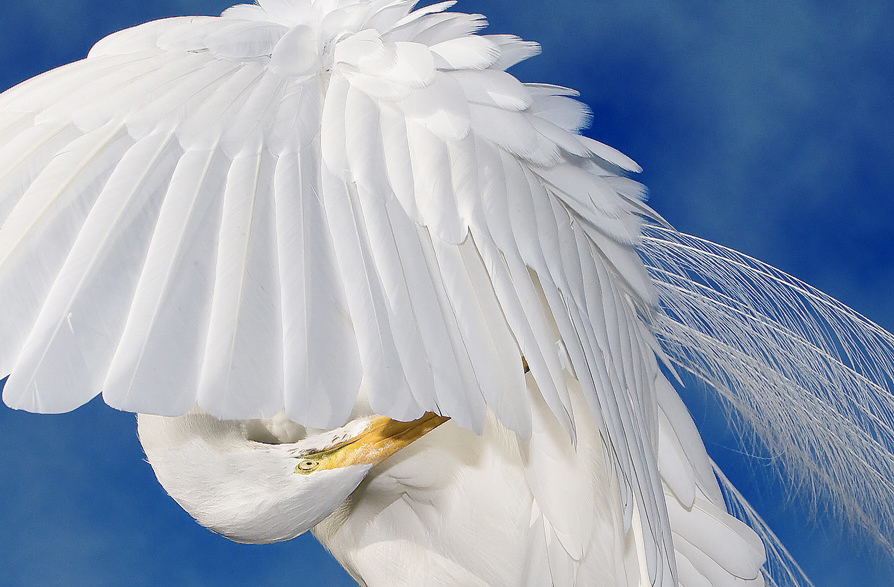
Preening by an egret

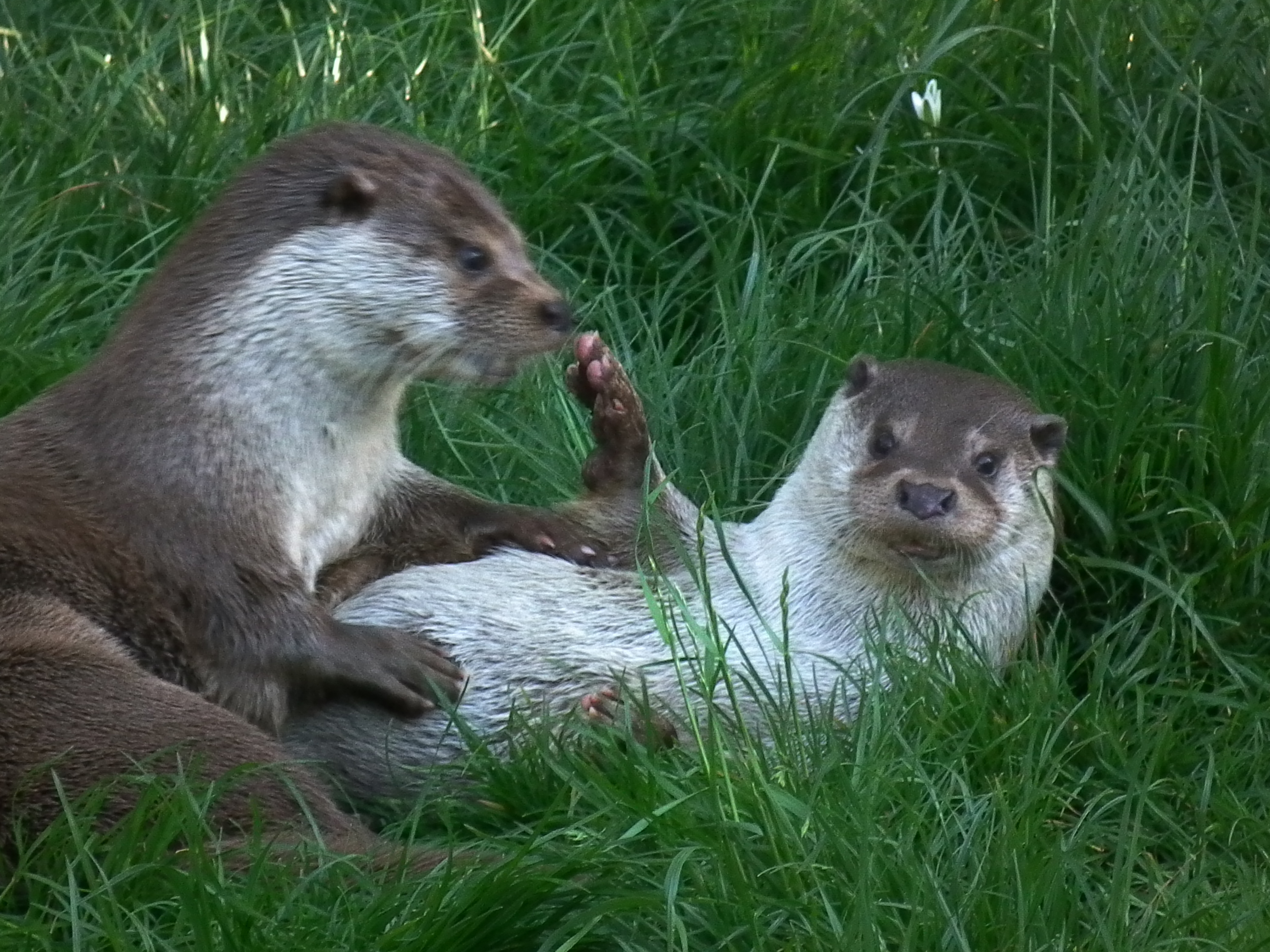
Playing by otters

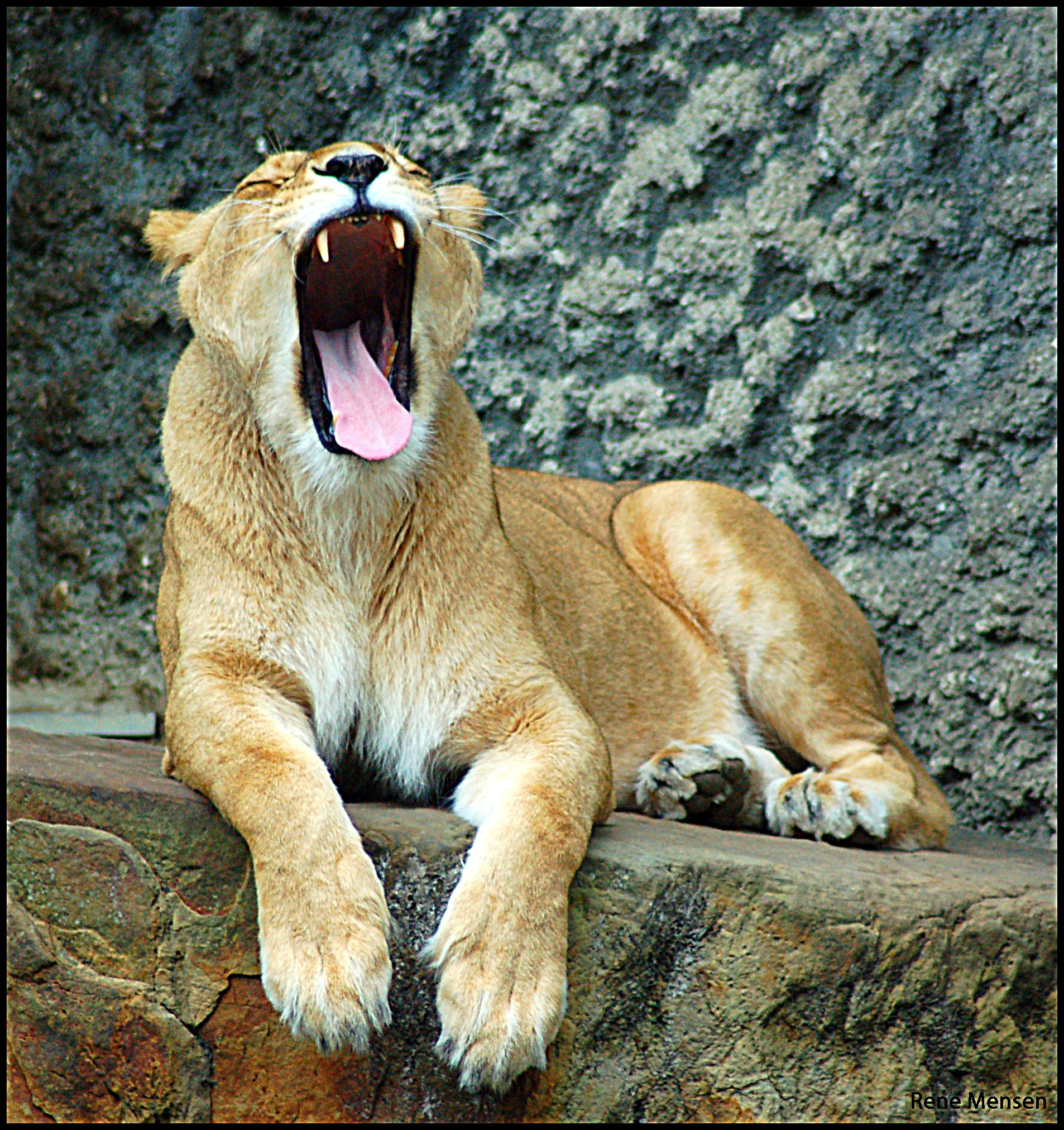
Yawning by a lion

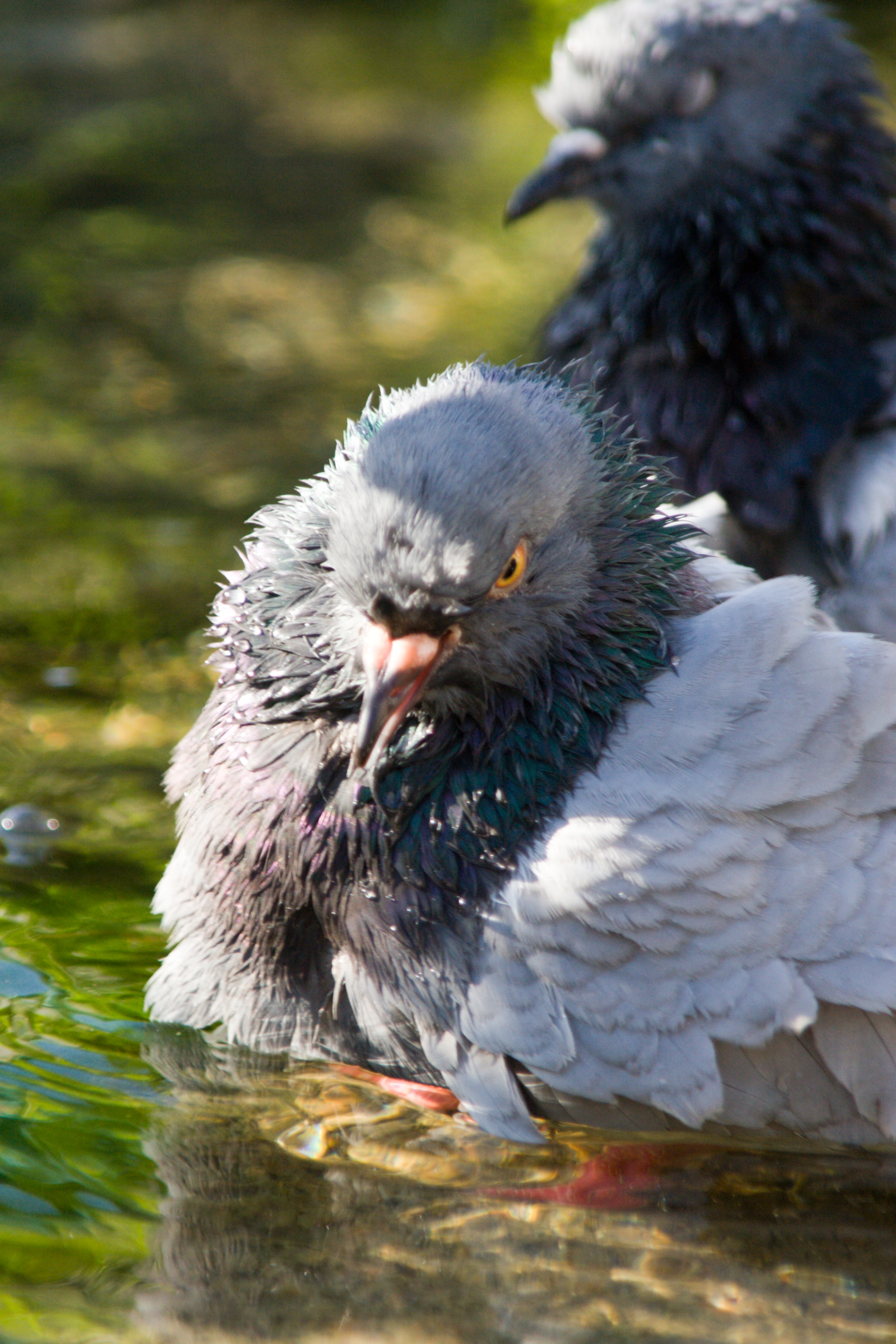
Water-bathing by a pigeon

== See also ==
- Personal grooming
- Ethogram
