= Furnished cage =

Agricultural technology

A furnished cage, sometimes called enriched cage, colony cage or modified cage, is a type of cage used in poultry farming for egg laying hens. Furnished cages have been designed to overcome some of the welfare concerns of battery cages (also called "conventional" or "traditional" cages) whilst retaining their economic and husbandry advantages, and also provide some of the welfare advantages over non-cage systems. Many design features of furnished cages have been incorporated because research in animal welfare science has shown them to be of benefit to the hens.

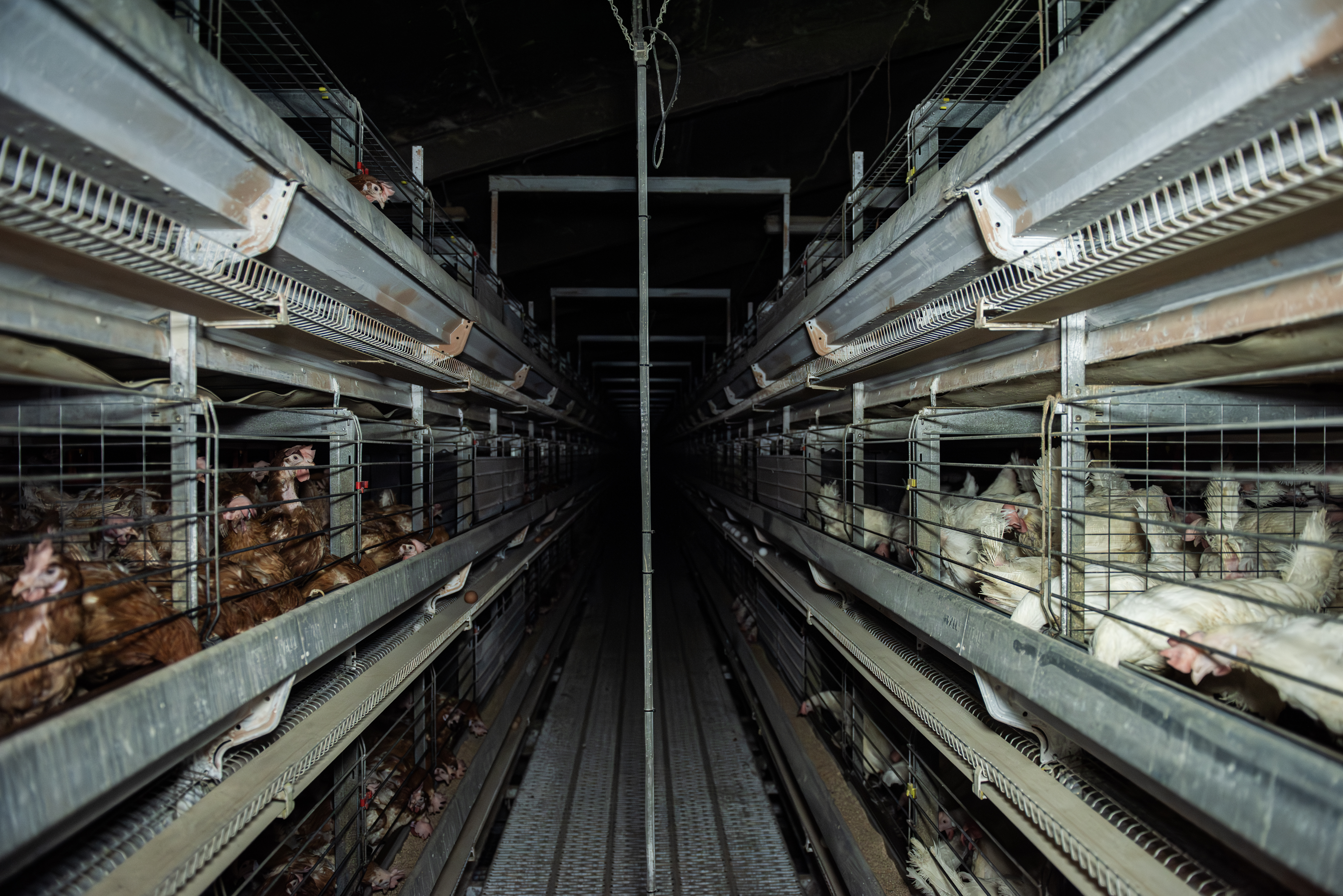
A furnished cage in the United Kingdom, 2020

== History and legislation ==
Battery cages have already banned in several countries including all European Union member states (since 2012 under European Union Council Directive 1999/74/EC), Norway (since 2012) and Switzerland (since 1992). New Zealand will phase out battery cages by 2022 and Canada by 2036. Prototype commercial furnished cage systems were being developed in the 1980s. As alternatives to battery cages, the EU Council Directive allowed non-cage systems and furnished cages. Furnished cages therefore represent a feasible alternative to battery cages in the EU after 2012.

For laying hens, Austria banned battery cages in 2009 and furnished cages in 2020. Luxembourg has also banned the use of furnished cages. Germany introduced a "family cage", which has more space than the furnished cages used in other countries; however, consumers in Germany had reportedly been rejecting these eggs by 2011. Caged farming was eventually banned in Germany in 2015, with a transition period to 2025. Outside the EU, Switzerland has already banned both the battery and furnished cage systems. For meat rabbits, Austria has banned the use of cages; Belgium officially prohibits battery cages since 1 January 2020 and will also prohibit enriched cages from 31 January 2024. However, the alternative system of "park cages", in which groups of at least 20 animals are given 800 cm^{2} (120 sq in) per animal (12.5 rabbits per m^{2}) has also faced heavy criticism from animal welfarists, especially when in early 2020 the Flemish Centre for Agro and Fishery Marketing (VLAM) launched a campaign to consume more rabbit meat.

All major UK supermarkets have promised to stop selling eggs from furnished cages by 2025. In April 2010, the Norwegian grocery chain Rema 1000 decided to stop selling eggs from both battery and furnished cage hens by the year 2012. Several more industry groups have decided to voluntarily phase out furnished cages as well, such as NorgesGruppen by 2019 and Nortura by 2024, while in April 2017 the Green Party proposed to ban furnished cages throughout the country by 2025.

=== EU specifications ===
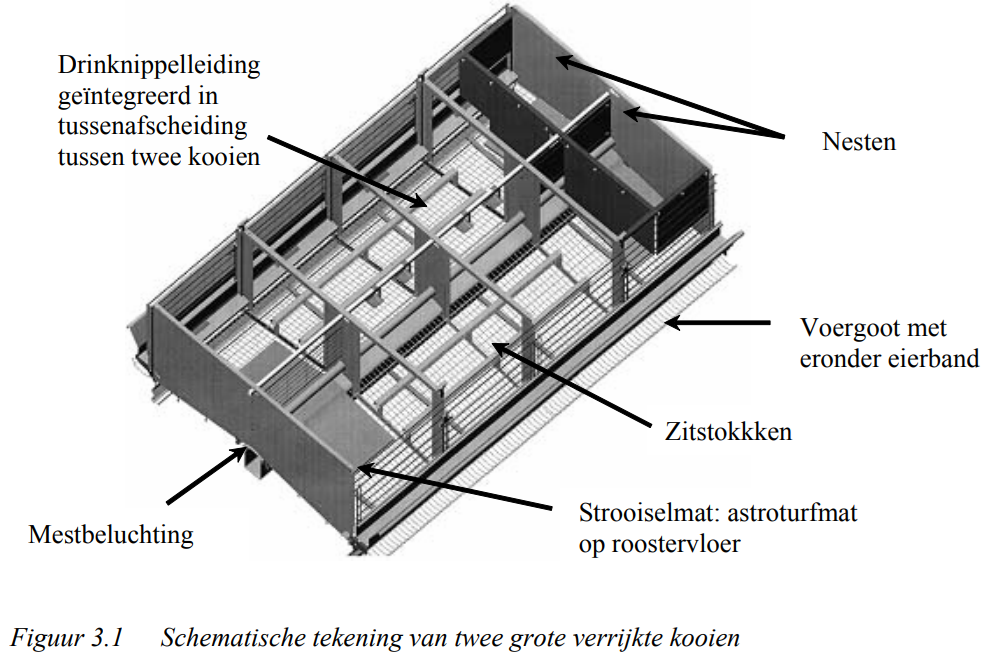
Schematic drawing of two large enriched cages for laying hens in industrial egg production, 2007.

Under Directive 1999/74/EC, furnished cages must provide at least the following:

1. laying hens must have:

(a) at least 750 cm^{2} [120 sq in] of cage area per hen, 600 cm^{2} [90 sq in] of which shall be usable; the height of the cage other than that above the usable area shall be at least 20 cm [8"] at every point and no cage shall have a total area that is less than 2000 cm^{2} [400 sq in];
(b) a nest;
(c) litter such that pecking and scratching are possible;
(d) appropriate perches allowing at least 15 cm [6"] per hen;

2. a feed trough which may be used without restriction must be provided. Its length must be at least 12 cm [5"] multiplied by the number of hens in the cage;
3. each cage must have a drinking system appropriate to the size of the group; where nipple drinkers are provided, at least two nipple drinkers or two cups must be within the reach of each hen;
4. to facilitate inspection, installation and depopulation of hens there must be a minimum aisle width of 90 cm [36"] between tiers of cages and a space of at least 35 cm [14"] must be allowed between the floor of the building and the bottom tier of cages;

5. cages must be fitted with suitable claw-shortening devices.

Additionally,

(a) if systems of rearing are used where the laying hens can move freely between different levels,

(i) there shall be no more than four levels;
(ii) the headroom between the levels must be at least 45 cm [18"];
(iii) the drinking and feeding facilities must be distributed in such a way as to provide equal access for all hens;
(iv) the levels must be so arranged as to prevent droppings falling on the levels below.

As the minimum total area of 2,000 cm^{2} (310 sq in) per cage allows 2.7 times the minimum of 750 cm^{2} (116 sq in) cage area per hen, this means that a maximum of two laying hens is acceptable in the smallest of cages.

== Furnished cages and battery cages ==
Furnished cages retain several advantages of battery cages in that they

- Separate the eggs from the hens' feces thereby keeping the eggs clean
- Protect the hens from predation
- Automatically collect the eggs thereby preventing egg-eating and floor-laying which both incur additional cost
- Retain a small group size which reduces injurious pecking behaviour

== Current designs ==
There is no clear limit to the size of the furnished cages. Although initial models were not much larger than conventional battery cages, most current designs house 40 to 80 hens although one system houses 115 hens. The depth of furnished cages is often more than the depth of battery cages and as a result, they are often arranged with only one cage row per level, i.e. not connected back-to-back. The more shallow cages can be connected back-to-back. To create space for large groups of hens, some designs of furnished cages are very long. Cage bottoms are made of wire mesh or plastic slats and are sloped so that eggs not laid in the nest box roll onto an egg belt. Feed is provided in feeders outside the cage, although in some designs there may be internal feeders or a combination of the two. Perches in some designs are raised and in others are at floor level.

== Welfare benefits ==
In a study by Sherwin et al. (2010), which compared the welfare benefits of hens in furnished cages, battery cages, free range and barn systems, hens in furnished cages had the lowest faecal corticosterone (a hormone that indicates stress levels), the lowest number of hens that were vent pecked, lowest number of egg shells with calcium spots (an indicator of stress when the egg is temporarily retained by the hen), lowest number of egg shells with blood spots on (usually caused by prolapse), lowest score of skin damage, lowest severity of vent damage caused by vent pecking and lowest plumage soiling. Hens in furnished cages had a similar percentage of hens with recent keel fractures which are usually caused during depopulation (3.6%) compared to hens in barn (1.2%) and free-range systems (1.3%), all of which were considerably lower than in hens from battery cages (24.6%). Furthermore, hens in furnished cages had a smaller percentage of old keel fractures (31.7%) compared to hens in barn (69.1%) and free-range (59.8%) systems but more than hens in battery cages (17.7%). This indicates that furnished cages protect against the keel breaks that are common amongst non-caged hens and also protects against the effects of osteoporosis prevalent in battery cages causing bones to be weak and easily broken during depopulation. In this study, mortality rates were above the breed standards in all systems except the furnished cages.

== Welfare disadvantages ==
Furnished cages provide more space than battery cages but still prevent some behaviours such as vigorous wing-flapping, flying, nest-building (no materials are provided) and inhibit others (comfort or grooming behaviours) determined partly by the numbers of hens in the cage. The hens are not separated from their feces as completely as hens in battery cages and therefore are at a greater risk of disease, although not as great as the risk to hens in non-cage systems. The small amount of litter that is provided in furnished cages is often distributed quickly or flicked out the cage, possibly resulting in frustration for hens wishing to dustbath and resulting in sham dustbathing. The nest boxes are often occupied by hens using the box for behaviours other than egg-laying (e.g. for sleeping or sham dustbathing) which could lead to frustration in hens wishing to lay an egg.

== Production in furnished cages ==
Some studies indicate that production in furnished cages is comparable to that in battery cages. Other studies indicate hens housed in furnished cages have better bodyweights and egg production compared to hens in battery cages.

== See also ==
- Abnormal behaviour of birds in captivity
- Cannibalism (poultry)
- Chicken#Farming
- Feather pecking
