= Toe pecking =

Abnormal behavior in captive birds

Toe pecking, an abnormal behaviour of birds in captivity, occurs when one bird pecks the toes of another using its beak. This behaviour has been reported in hens and ostriches. Studies have shown that hens exposed to toe pecking have significantly enlarged adrenal glands, indicating increased physiological stress. Hens exposed to toe pecking will step off a raised platform more quickly than control hens, possibly suggesting a heightened fear of elevation. They have also been reported to show depressive behaviour (retreating to corner of the pen, not eating and losing weight) when afflicted by toe-pecking. The act of toe pecking leads to open wounds which are viable for infection and disease to develop. In severe forms, toe pecking can be classified as a cannibalistic behaviour and has been reported as a cause of mortality.

== Contributing factors ==
Chickens kept in captivity are more likely to engage in abnormal behaviours such as toe pecking.

Chickens kept in captivity are more likely to engage in abnormal behaviours such as toe pecking.

The abnormal behaviour of toe pecking is suggested to be influenced by multiple causes. Some mainstream theories include;

- Overcrowding, when birds have been pecked at they are typically in captivity and given very little space to move around. This implies they are unable to escape, this lack of escape changes the birds’ behaviour in which they are less likely to fight back and rather accept the pecking to the point of injury.
- Natural establishment of pecking order, this becomes unhealthy when blood is drawn from the animal due to the pecking behaviour. Once blood appears the red coloration of it is enticing to chickens as they are naturally drawn to the color red. This may cause them to continue pecking at the same spot, causing further damage.
- Nutrient deficiencies, specifically salt and methionine. High energy and low-fiber increase energy and aggressive behaviours and therefore are more likely to influence toe-pecking behaviour.
- High heat and light, hostility and cannibalistic behaviours are very likely to occur in excessive heat or constantly lit spaces.
- Lack of feeder/water space, with limited resources aggression is likely to increase.

== Prevention ==
Addressing these issues and providing viable solutions is an important part of the animals welfare. Possible solutions could include, ensuring there is enough space for the bird. It is recommended hens should have approximately 4 square feet (chicken tractor) and 6-10 if in a coop. However, each bird species may differ on the recommended space.

Natural pecking order establishment occurs as a normal behaviour for birds. However, when it becomes abnormal (visible blood), it is important to separate any bird that may be to the point of bleeding from the other birds until they are healed to prevent further injury. This is likely to occur when new birds are introduced to the flock and therefore an introductory stage should be implemented.

High energy and low fiber diets cause chickens to have increased activity levels and aggression, this may lead to toe-pecking and other pecking behaviours. A balanced diet for the type and age of bird you are rising is an important factor in their behaviour. This includes the availability of the food to the birds.

Lastly, a regulated environment for birds is important to their welfare as a naturalistic setting is best for their health. Having too much heat or light may cause changes to their normal behavioural and physical cycles. Constant light may cause stress for birds and hostility towards each other. Too much heat results in similar aggressive behaviours. Temperatures should be kept relative to the type of bird being raised. By maintaining a constant environment birds are less likely to engage in abnormal behaviour.

Stress is typically the main contributing factor to abnormal behaviour such as toe pecking and therefore should be controlled as much as possible.

== Treatment ==
In the case of an outbreak, the following should be implemented to decrease toe pecking.

1. Correcting any abnormal behaviours (overly aggressive, antisocial), this may be done by observing the chickens naturalistic behaviours and grouping them based on their dominant or submissive personality types.
2. Decreasing light in the birds housing (i.e. red bulbs). This may be done by using red window panes or infrared lights in the chicken pens.
3. Removal of badly injured birds from the general population, having them in their own pen to heal and reduce stress levels.
4. "anti-peck" ointment application on damaged birds, this may be applied onto the effected area and should be consulted with a vet.
5. Lower temperature, ensuring the correct temperature for the type and age of chickens should be examined.

Identification of this issue is the first step and having preventative measures in place are important to control and manage this cannibalistic behaviour should it arise.

== See also ==
- Abnormal behaviour of birds in captivity
- Feather pecking
- Vent pecking
- Cannibalism (poultry)
- Chicken
- Poultry farming
- Battery cages
