= Pecking =

Behavior found in birds

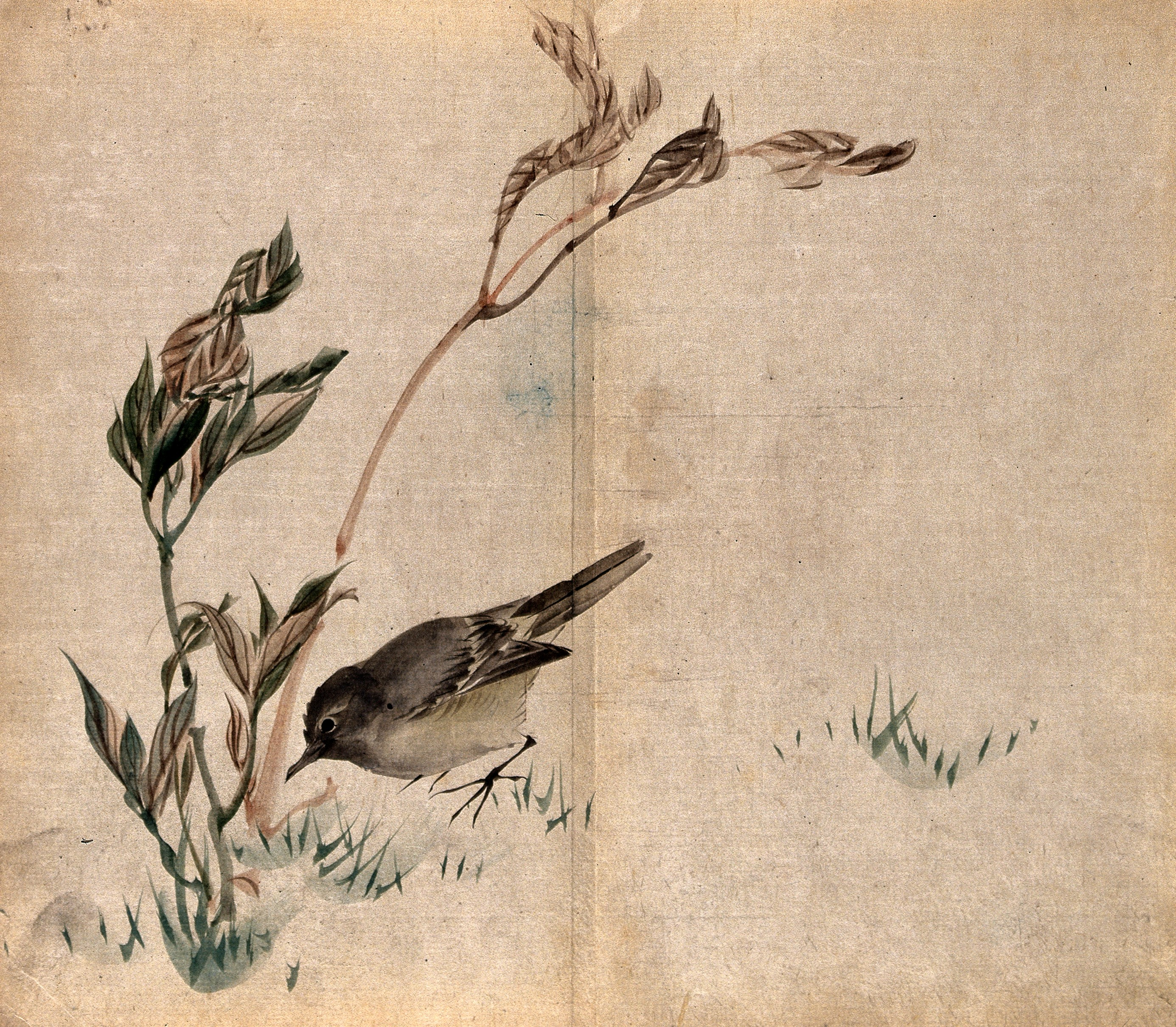
Watercolor illustration of a bird pecking at the base of a plant.

Pecking is the action of a bird using their beak to search for food or otherwise investigate an object or area by tapping it. Pecking can also be used by a bird to attack or fight another bird.

Pecking is frequently observed in chickens and other poultry, and in pigeons. Pecking is typically accomplished by movement of the neck.

Certain birds, particularly woodpeckers, engage in a specialized kind of pecking, using their beak to drill holes in trees in order to find insects under the bark. Woodpeckers also engage in a kind of pecking called drumming, a less-forceful type of pecking that serves to establish territory and attract mates. Woodpeckers drum on various reverberatory structures on buildings such as gutters, downspouts, chimneys, vents and aluminium sheeting.

The phrase, pecking order, referring to the hierarchical system of social organization was coined by Thorleif Schjelderup-Ebbe in 1921, in reference to the expression of dominance in chickens by behaviors including pecking. Schjelderup-Ebbe noted in his 1924 German-language article that "defense and aggression in the hen is accomplished with the beak". This emphasis on pecking led many subsequent studies on fowl behaviour to use it as a primary observation, however, it has been noted that roosters tend to leap and use their claws in conflicts.

== See also ==
- Feather pecking
- Toe pecking
- Vent pecking
- Dunnock § Breeding §§ Mating systems
