= Feather pecking =

When one bird repeatedly pecks at the feathers of another

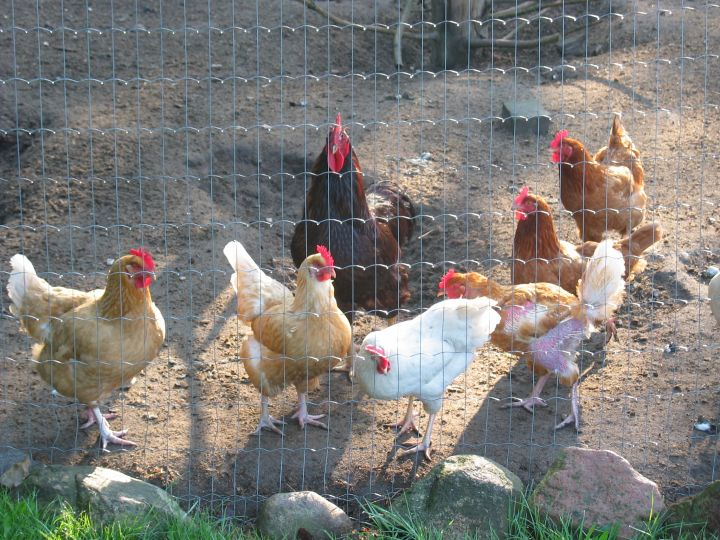
Feather pecking amongst laying hens. In the lower right of the picture, the white hen has lost her tail feathers and the brown hen has been feather pecked on the thigh and wing.

Feather pecking is a behavior that occurs most frequently amongst domestic hens reared for egg production, although it does occur in other poultry such as pheasants, turkeys, ducks, broiler chickens and is sometimes seen in farmed ostriches. Feather pecking occurs when one bird repeatedly pecks at the feathers of another. The levels of severity may be recognized as mild and severe. Gentle feather pecking is considered to be a normal investigatory behaviour where the feathers of the recipient are hardly disturbed and therefore does not represent a problem. In severe feather pecking, however, the feathers of the recipient are grasped, pulled at and sometimes removed. This is painful for the receiving bird and can lead to trauma of the skin or bleeding, which in turn can lead to cannibalism and death.

Feather pecking is one of the major problems facing the egg industry in non-cage systems and is set to become an even greater issue with the EU legislation (Council Directive 1999/74/EC) ban on the keeping of laying hens in barren battery cages which came into force in 2012, and the prospect of a ban on beak-trimming (see below). Reducing feather pecking without resorting to beak-trimming is an important goal for the poultry industry.

== Motivational basis ==
Feather pecking is considered to be re-directed behaviour, developing either from ground pecking or pecking during dustbathing, although the former hypothesis is now the more favoured. Captive birds are very often kept in barren environments with limited foraging opportunities and in addition, are usually fed a nutrient-dense diet which can be eaten in a few minutes rather than the hours it would require to acquire during normal foraging. In combination, these cause the birds' foraging activity to be re-directed to the feathers of their conspecifics.

- Feather pecking is not aggression. During aggressive encounters, hens peck exclusively at the top of the head or the comb, whereas during feather pecking, the areas of the body that are usually targeted are the base of the tail over the uropygial or preen gland, the back, the tail feathers and the wing feathers.
- Although feather pecking activity may be related to dominance relationships or the pecking order, formation of the dominance hierarchy is not involved in the causation of feather pecking.
- Feather pecking is also distinct from another psychopathological behaviour called feather-plucking or feather-picking. In feather-plucking, birds, often housed in isolation, remove feathers from their own body; in feather pecking, however, birds peck at each other's feathers.

Sometimes, feathers that are removed are then eaten, in which case the behaviour is termed "feather eating". Whilst there may be a positive association between feather pecking and eating, at least in the individual bird, this is likely due to an overall higher pecking motivation. Eating feathers increases gut transit indicating that feather pecking and feather eating have a different motivational basis.

== Development ==
Early experience can influence severe feather pecking in later life. Commercial egg-laying hens have often already begun feather pecking when they are transferred to the egg laying farm from the rearing farm at approximately 16–20 weeks of age, and plumage quality can then rapidly deteriorate until peak lay at approximately 25 weeks of age. Severe feather pecking can either begin or persist beyond this age although it rarely begins after 40 weeks of age.

Although there are links between gentle feather pecking and severe feather pecking, it is still not clear whether the gentle form leads to the severe form.

Some areas of the body are targeted for feather pecking and there is a pattern in the development of which areas are pecked. The rump area over the uropygial gland and the tail are often the first body regions to show signs of plumage damage due to feather pecking, followed by the neck, wings and back, although in the ostrich which has a similar pattern of feather pecking development, the uropygial gland is absent.

== Prevalence ==
Although feather pecking occurs in all commercial housing systems used for egg laying hens, it is often more prevalent or severe in loose flock systems because it is less easy to control and can spread more rapidly. Prevalence figures range between 57 and 86% of free-range flocks and 99% of hens within a flock can be affected. The UK national flock of egg laying hens is currently (2011) approximately 33 million birds of which approximately 10 million are free-range. This indicates that 5.5 million free-range hens/year are likely to be affected by feather pecking. It has been estimated that 4% of hens on free-range farms die because of feather pecking, representing 220,000 deaths each year in the UK alone due to this behavioural problem. EU legislation (Council Directive 1999/74/EC) will ban battery or conventional cages in 2012 meaning that many producers will change to using free-range systems, possibly exacerbating this welfare problem until effective methods of its control are learned - see Defra's "A Guide To The Practical Management of Feather Pecking & Cannibalism in Free Range Laying Hens"

== Risk factors ==
Feather pecking is a multifactorial problem and a large number of risk factors have been identified for commercial flocks.

Factors likely to reduce feather pecking are:

=== Diet ===
- Minimal number of diet changes
- Ad libitum feeding
- Mashed feed rather than pelleted
- Diet balanced for protein and methionine
- Dietary tryptophan

=== Genetics ===
- White breeds such as the Amberlink compared to pigmented breeds
- Less flighty breeds

=== Housing and husbandry ===
- Dark brooders
- Purchasing the hens at an earlier age and allowing them on the range earlier
- Delaying the onset of lay
- Maintaining a uniform flock (purchase single flocks and do not mix)
- Pan feeders rather than chain feeders
- Nipple drinkers rather than bell drinkers
- Good litter quality
- Good air quality (low levels of ammonia and carbon dioxide)
- Decreased light intensity
- Decreased noise levels
- House temperature above 20 °C (68 °F)
- Multiple persons inspecting the hens
- Minimal light changes for inspection
- Avoiding using lights in nest boxes

=== Hen behaviour ===
- Increased use of the range (e.g. smaller flocks, increasing shelter, cockerels)
- Reduced fearfulness

=== Health ===
- Good health, especially avoiding egg peritonitis and infectious bronchitis

== Methods of control ==
=== Beak-trimming ===
Beak-trimming, sometimes misleadingly termed debeaking, is perhaps most accurately described as "partial beak-amputation". It is performed on poultry to reduce the incidence or damage caused by feather pecking or cannibalism and involves amputating the distal one to two thirds of the bird's beak by either a blade or infra-red beam. Beak-trimming causes welfare concerns because the internal tissue of the beak contains many nerves which are transected during the process - it is only the surface and extreme tip of the beak that is keratinised, dead tissue. This can lead to neuromas (abnormal nerve regeneration) developing in the amputated beak stump from which there might be abnormal spontaneous neural discharges similar to the discharges originating from stump neuromas in human amputees and implicated in phantom limb pain.

It has been shown that domestic hens have iron mineral deposits in the dendrites in the upper beak and are capable of magnetoreception. Because hens use directional information from the magnetic field of the Earth to orient in relatively small areas, this raises the possibility that beak-trimming impairs the ability of hens to orient in extensive systems, or move in and out of buildings in free-range systems.

A further negative aspect of beak-trimming is that it leaves birds less able to groom themselves effectively, thus beak-trimmed hens have greater ectoparasite burdens than hens with intact beaks.

=== Light manipulations ===
A widely used method of reducing feather pecking is to reduce light intensity, but because a minimum of 5 lux is necessary to maintain egg laying, intensities of 10 lux or more are recommended. At these low intensities it becomes difficult for humans to inspect the hens properly, especially in the more crowded densely populated housing systems, and human colour vision is hindered making the detection of blood almost impossible. Low light intensities may be associated with other welfare costs to the hens as they prefer to eat in brightly lit environments and prefer brightly lit areas for active behaviour but dim (<10 lux) for inactive behaviour. Dimming the lights can also cause problems when the intensity is then abruptly increased temporarily to inspect the hens; this has been associated as a risk factor of increased feather pecking and the birds can become frightened resulting in panic-type ("hysteria") reactions which can increase the risk of injury. In turkeys, low light intensities (perhaps in combination with long light phases) can cause retinal detachment and buphthalmia, a distortion of the eye morphology that can lead to blindness. This does not appear to have been investigated for layer hens under modern lighting patterns. Gradual changes in light intensity simulating a dawn and dusk at the beginning and end of the light phase rather than switching off lights abruptly enables birds to feed in anticipation of the dark period and to move safely to roosts, rather than moving in the dark and risking injury which is possibly more important in furnished systems. Many producers have tried placing red filters over windows or using red lighting to reduce feather pecking and cannibalism. This was even the subject of a patent, however, if such a simple solution was effective, it would have been adopted widely by the industry.

It has been suggested that the absence of UV from artificial light sources may have a role in the causation of feather pecking in turkeys. The extent to which the absence of UV from artificial lights compromises poultry and other animal welfare is not yet known. Other poultry species prefer areas illuminated with additional UV, but poultry reared without UV show little indication of being stressed.

=== Selective breeding and genetics ===
Feather pecking has a heritable component with heritabilities for this trait ranging from 0.07 to 0.56. Lines of hens exhibiting high or low feather pecking activity have been developed by artificial selection with high feather pecking birds showing more feather pecking than low feather pecking birds from the second generation onwards.

Selection for indirect indicators of feather pecking, specifically intact feather cover and livability in multi-bird groups leads, has led to reductions in feather pecking and cannibalism. Considerable additive genetic variation exists for these traits with estimates of heritability ranging from 0.22 to 0.54. A trait has been identified which combines feather pecking and cannibalism leading to severe injury or death in beak-intact birds; this has a high heritability at 0.65.

There has been less work at the molecular level of the genetics of feather pecking. Major genes for feather pecking have been found along with the polygenes. There are markers for severe feather pecking on chromosomes 1, 2, and 10 and also possibly on chromosome 3.

=== Devices (bits and spectacles) ===
Devices have been developed to reduce or eliminate the damaging effects of feather pecking. These devices require time and skill to fit and therefore have problems of practicality given that commercial flocks usually contain several thousands of birds. Because of this, they are not used widely in modern poultry production, except for gamekeeping.

- Bits or bumpabits are small, plastic circlips, the body of which passes between the maxilla and mandible of the beak and are held in place by the ends of the circlip being placed in the nostrils or nares. Some are held in place by a pin which pierces through the nasal septum. These devices make it difficult for the bird to completely close its beak and grasp the feathers of another individual.

Blinders for poultry - From the U.S. Patent "Device to prevent picking in poultry" filed in 1935

- Spectacles or 'blinders' are pieces of plastic or metal shaped like opaque spectacles and attached to the bird's beak to block its vision. The devices are held in place either with a circlip which enters the nares or a pin which pierces through the nasal septum. These devices are based on the principle that by interfering with the vision of the bird, it is less able to visually locate the feathers of another bird and is therefore less able to grasp and pull the feathers.

==== Legislation ====
Legislation regarding these devices in the UK is formulated by Defra.

For laying hens, the relevant literature is the Defra Code of Recommendations for the Welfare of Livestock: Laying Hens. This states:

The Welfare of Livestock (Prohibited Operations) Regulations 1982 (S.I. 1982 No.1884) prohibits...the fitting of any appliance which has the object or effect of limiting vision to a bird by a method involving the penetration or other mutilation of the nasal septum.

For gamebirds, the relevant legislation is the Defra Code of Practice for the Welfare of Gamebirds Reared for Sporting Purposes. This states:

5.1 The use of management devices or practices that do not allow birds to fully express their range of normal behaviours should not be considered as routine and keepers should work towards the ideal of management systems that do not require these devices. Such devices and practices include mutilations...and the use of bits, spectacles and hoods to prevent feather pecking, egg eating or aggression. Their use should be justified on a flock by flock basis and regularly reviewed in the flock health and welfare plan. Any device that is designed to pierce the nasal septum is illegal.

== See also ==
- Abnormal behaviour of birds in captivity
- Battery cages
- Blinders (poultry)
- Cannibalism
- Cannibalism in poultry
- Chicken
- Chicken eyeglasses
- Domestic turkey
- Dubbing (poultry)
- Furnished cages
- List of abnormal behaviours in animals
- Poultry farming
- Toe pecking
- Vent pecking
