= Abnormal behaviour of birds in captivity =

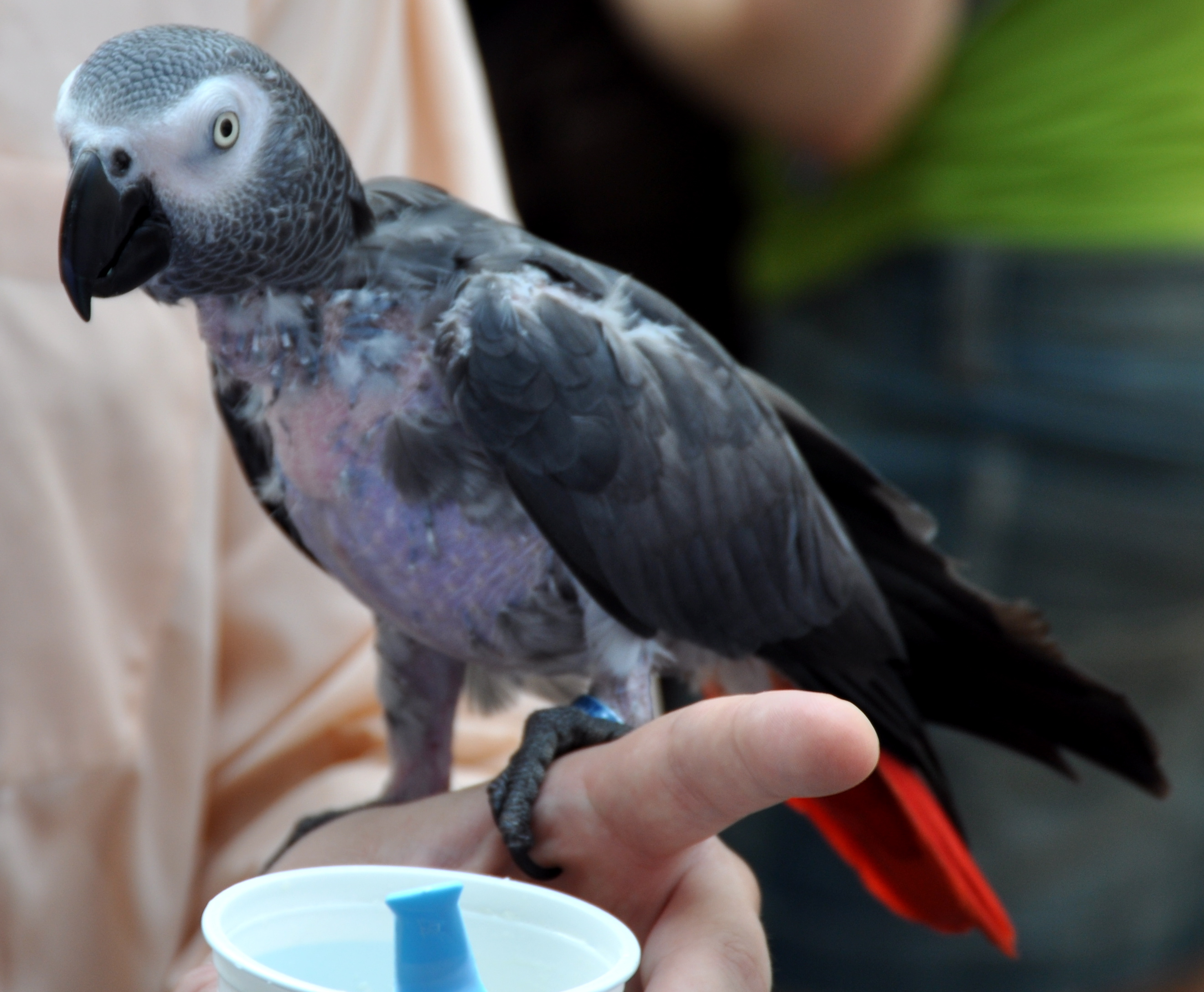
A pet grey parrot displaying signs of extensive feather-plucking.

Abnormal behavior of birds in captivity has been found to occur among both domesticated and wild birds. Abnormal behavior can be defined in several ways. Statistically, 'abnormal' is when the occurrence, frequency or intensity of a behaviour varies significantly, either more or less, from the normal value. This means that theoretically, almost any behaviour could become 'abnormal' in an individual. Less formally, 'abnormal' includes any activity judged to be outside the normal behaviour pattern for captive birds of that particular class or age. For example, if a species is known to frequently engage in running (rather than flying) behavior, observing it doing so would of course be considered normal, but if a species known for only occasionally engaging in running behavior were observed to frequently do so, it would be considered abnormal. Finally, in a species not known for engaging in running behavior, virtually any observation of such would likely be viewed as abnormal. This article does not include 'one-off' behaviours performed by individual birds that might be considered abnormal for that individual, unless these are performed repeatedly by other individuals in the species and are recognised as part of the ethogram of that species.

Most abnormal behaviours can be categorised collectively (e.g., eliminative, ingestive, stereotypies), however, many abnormal behaviours fall debatably into several of these categories and categorisation is therefore not attempted in this article. Abnormal behaviours here are considered to be related to captive housing but may also be due to medical conditions. The article does not include behaviours in birds that are genetically modified to express abnormal behaviour.

== Behaviors ==
When housed under captive or commercial conditions, birds often show a range of abnormal behaviours. These are often self-injurious or harmful to other individuals, and can include feather and toe pecking, cannibalism, stereotypy, vent pecking, as well as abnormal sexual behaviours such as chronic egg laying.

=== Feather and toe pecking ===
Feather pecking is an abnormal behaviour observed in birds in captivity (primarily in laying hens) whereby one bird repeatedly pecks the feathers of another. Toe pecking is a similar occurrence in commercialized hens which includes repeatedly pecking the toes of another. Each of these behaviours have been tied to physiological stress (i.e., extremely enlarged adrenal glands) likely caused by housing conditions in captivity.

=== Cannibalism ===
Cannibalism in birds of captivity is a behaviour often linked to feather pecking. With increasing frequency and intensity of feather pecking, the risk and prevalence of cannibalism increases. Since feather pecking leads to increased food consumption due to heat loss through the skin of the bird, and feather pecking is an already aggressive behaviour that consists of cannibalistic qualities, cannibalism is a common consequential effect. Cannibalism is defined as the act of consuming all or part of another individual of the same species as food.

=== Stereotypy ===
Stereotypies are invariant, repetitive behaviour patterns with no blatant function or objective, and seem to be restricted to captive and/or mentally-impaired animals. Stereotypies are the result of inability of an animal to perform a normal behaviour due to external environmental conditions or circumstance. A common stereotypy in laying hens is pacing which involves the animal constantly walking back and forth in a seemingly ritualistic manner due to no access to a suitable nest site. The pacing stereotypy is also hypothesized to arise from intentional movements of escape, specifically in captive animals such as birds. The overabundance as well as lack of stimulation associated with the sub-optimal environment of captivity are the common factors amongst development of stereotypy behaviours in birds.

=== Vent pecking ===
Vent pecking is an abnormal behaviour observed in birds in captivity that involves pecking and causing damage to the cloaca, its surrounding skin, and underlying tissue of another bird. Occurrence of vent pecking is primarily immediately after a bird has oviposited when the cloaca is red and enlarged. Vent pecking, like feather pecking, is a gateway behaviour to cannibalism due to its cannibalistic features of hostility towards another individual that involves the aggressive tearing and damaging of the skin and tissue. Vent cannibalism was found to be the most common type of cannibalism causing death in necropsy results of laying hens.

=== Additional behaviors ===
- Toe pecking
- Feather plucking
- Stereotypies
- Polydipsia
- Sham or "vacuum" dustbathing
- Jealous, over-possessive parrot
- Chronic egg laying
- Infertility
- Abnormal biting

== Causes ==
When analyzing the behaviour of birds in captivity, what is considered normal or abnormal behaviour is dependent on the form and frequency that the particular behaviour is expressed in the natural environment. Birds raised in pet stores tend to be raised with other birds; however, after being sold and taken to the owner's home, birds in captivity are often housed in isolation and in environments lacking abundant resources or complex stimuli. In the United States, it is estimated that forty million birds are kept caged and improperly cared for. Because of these inappropriate housing conditions, abnormal behaviour patterns may appear in caged birds kept as pets. Once established, these abnormal behaviours in birds are often not alterable.

When social interactions amongst birds are absent or inadequate, abnormal social behaviour may develop. For example, a study regarding parrots that had been isolated in cages demonstrated that most birds showing this social deprivation had significant behavioural disturbances, such as aggressive behaviour, feather picking, self-mutilation, restlessness, screaming, apathetic behavior, and stereotypies. Several parrots living in captivity monitored during a study have displayed behaviors consisting of screaming excessively and biting. This specific noise made by these birds is encouraged in captivity. Biting however is not a typical defense mechanism used by wild parrots. Cannibalism often occurs in large animal husbandry systems, which are usually impoverished environments with a lack of opportunities. In addition, studies of caged canaries have revealed two common stereotypies. These include spot picking, where birds repeatedly touch a particular spot in the environment with the tip of their beak, and route tracing, a pacing behaviour associated with physical restrictions in movement imposed by the cage. The absence of song learning in zebra finches has also been implicated as a behavioural abnormality. In these birds, the social interaction of a young male with his song tutor is important for normal song development. Without the stimulus, the song, which is necessary for mating behavior, will not be learned.

Researchers have analyzed ways to alleviate some abnormal behaviours in caged birds. Presenting these birds with novel stimuli e.g. a mirror or plastic birds, and social stimuli, such as a brief view of a bird in another cage, significantly reduced stereotypies. In addition, it has been suggested that keeping caged birds in pairs or small groups may reduce the development of abnormal behaviours; however, little quantitative evidence has thus far been collected to support this claim.

Statistically, 1/10 of endangered birds tend to have egg infertility, but this number increases for breeders of endangered species working with captive birds.

In addition to the abnormal behaviours exhibited as a result of commercialized captivity such as for poultry, there also exist problematic behaviours that occur as a function of the social deprivation associated with domestication. Social deprivation is the prevention or reduction of normal interaction between an individual and others in their species. Currently the dominant method for rearing domesticated birds is "hand-rearing" which requires chicks be separated from their parents for periods of time up to several months. The social deprivation associated with this technique of upbringing is one of the most detrimental forms of social deprivation since even short-term disruptions in parental care can cause extreme abnormal behaviour in the affected young. For example, normal sexual and habitat imprinting is altered in both male and female birds as a result of maternal separation, as well as individual ability to adapt to stressors within the environment. Neophobia is the avoidance of novel objects in the environment and is diminished with social deprivation and maternal separation. A lack of neophobia can decrease probability of survival due to the affected animal's lack of hesitation to approach potentially dangerous stimuli. Moreover, many juveniles require a song tutor to accomplish the song learning necessary for successful mating practices. Therefore, socially deprived juveniles may exhibit abnormal vocal and consequent mating behaviours which may be detrimental to their survival.

Once established, these abnormal behaviours are often not transformable. There is presently little research regarding a solution to the abnormality caused by captivity in birds; however, it has been suggested that keeping domesticated caged birds in small groups or pairs may reduce the likelihood of developing abnormal behaviours.

== See also ==
- Animal psychopathology
- Battery cages
- Chicken
- Comparative psychology
- Furnished cages
- List of abnormal behaviours in animals
- Stereotypy
- Stereotypy (non-human)
