= Ethogram =

Catalogue of behaviours exhibited by an animal

An ethogram is a catalogue or inventory of behaviours or actions exhibited by an animal used in ethology.

The behaviours in an ethogram are usually defined to be mutually exclusive and objective, avoiding subjectivity and functional inference as to their possible purpose. For example, a species may use a putative threat display, which in the ethogram is given a descriptive name such as "head forward" or "chest-beating display", and not "head forward threat" or "chest-beating threat". This degree of objectivity is required because what looks like "courtship" might have a completely different function, and in addition, the same motor patterns in different species can have very different functions (e.g. tail wagging in cats and dogs). Objectivity and clarity in the definitions of behaviours also improve inter-observer reliability.

Often, ethograms are hierarchical in presentation. The defined behaviours are recorded under broader categories of behaviour which may allow functional inference such that "head forward" is recorded under "Aggression". In ethograms of social behaviour, the ethogram may also indicate the "Giver" and "Receiver" of activities.

Sometimes, the definition of a behaviour in an ethogram may have arbitrary components. For example, "Stereotyped licking" might be defined as "licking the bars of the cage more than 5 times in 30 seconds". The definition may be arguable, but if it is stated clearly, it fulfils the requirements of scientific repeatability and clarity of reporting and data recording.

Some ethograms are given in pictorial form and not only catalogue the behaviours but indicate the frequency of their occurrence and the probability that one behaviour follows another. This probability can be indicated numerically or by the thickness of an arrow connecting the two behaviours. Sometimes the proportion of time that each behaviour occupies can be represented in a pie chart or bar chart.

== Applications ==
Ethograms are used extensively in animal welfare science. Ethograms can be used to detect the occurrence or prevalence of abnormal behaviours (e.g. stereotypies, feather pecking, tail-biting), normal behaviours (e.g. comfort behaviours), departures from the ethogram of ancestral species and the behaviour of captive animals upon release into a natural environment.

Ethograms have been applied to research on the behavioural response of animals to the presence of humans. For example, it has been used to analyze the reactions of black bears and baboons to humans.
