= Sham dustbathing =

Abnormal bird behavior

Sham dustbathing is a behaviour performed by some birds when kept in cages with little or no access to litter, during which the birds perform all the elements of normal dustbathing, but in the complete absence of any substrate. This behaviour often has all the activities and temporal patterns of normal dustbathing, i.e. the bird initially scratches and bill-rakes at the ground, then erects its feathers and squats. Once lying down, the behaviour contains four main elements: vertical wing-shaking, head rubbing, bill-raking and scratching with one leg. Normal dustbathing is a maintenance behaviour whose performance results in dust collecting between the feathers. The dust is then subsequently shaken off which reduces the amount of feather lipids and so helps the plumage maintain good insulating capacity and may help control ectoparasites.

== Terminology ==
Sham dustbathing is sometimes referred to as "vacuum dustbathing". In the Konrad Lorenz model of behaviour regulation, vacuum activities occur when motivation for a certain behaviour builds to a sufficiently high level that the behaviour is performed in the complete absence of relevant stimuli. However, hens "dustbathing" on wire floors commonly perform this close to the feed trough where they can peck and bill-rake in the food. Because it seems the birds appear to treat the feed as a dustbathing substrate, the term "sham dustbathing" is more appropriate.

== Motivational basis ==
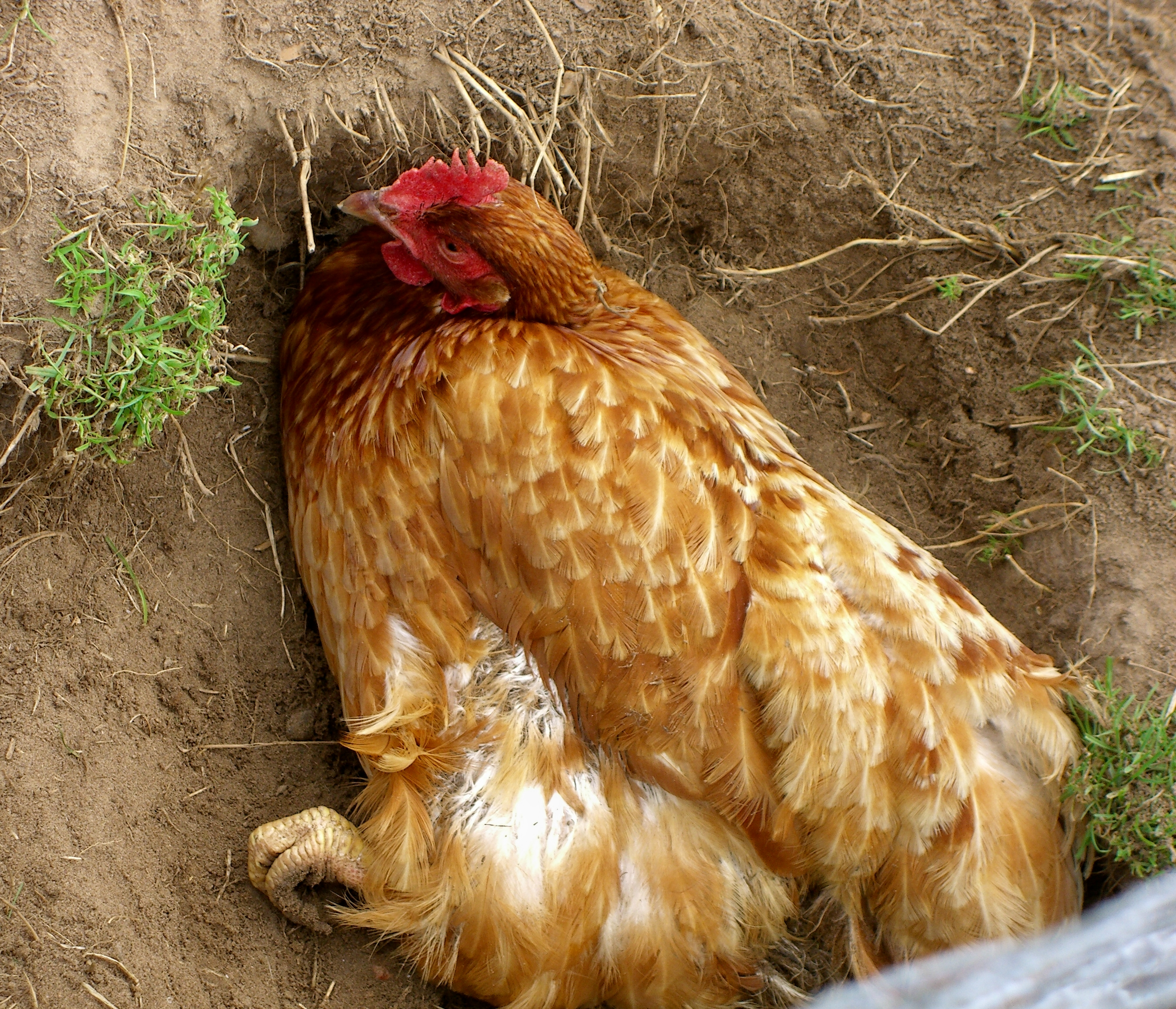
A hen performing normal dustbathing

Sham dustbathing, like normal dustbathing, appears to have both internal and external causal factors.

=== Internal causal factors ===
Under unrestricted conditions, adult birds dustbathe about every second day, with a diurnal rhythm peaking in the middle of the day, and an average dustbathing bout lasting about 27 minutes. Hens without litter (i.e. an absence of external causal factors) will perform sham dustbathing with a similar temporal pattern. Some hens deprived of litter until they had developed sham dustbathing and then given access to litter, showed sham dustbathing although litter was available. Thus, there is some support for an effect of habit or early experience on sham dustbathing.

Depriving hens of the opportunity to dustbathe results in a rebound when hens are again allowed access to dust. Birds work for access to litter, in which case they sometimes, although not always, dustbathe. There are indications of stress when hens are deprived of the possibility to dustbathe, and if this deprivation is sufficiently long, sham dustbathing behaviour develops.

=== External causal factors ===
It has been suggested that the sight of other hens performing the behaviour increases the probability of sham dustbathing, i.e. social facilitation; However, when tested, the sight of stimulus birds had no effect on the sham dustbathing behaviour of test birds. As indicated above, hens "dustbathing" on wire floors commonly perform this close to the feed trough where they can peck and bill-rake in the food, indicating this may be an external causal factor.

== Welfare ==
Sham dustbathing raises questions regarding hen behavior, motivation, and welfare. A study utilized a weighted push-door as the operant method to assess the motivation of adult hens with varying experiences of litter. There was no discernible difference in motivation levels between hens with prior exposure to litter and those without. This suggests that sham dustbathing might not adequately fulfill the hens' needs nor is it perceived as normal dustbathing.

== See also ==
- Ethogram
