= Sex determination =

Sex determination may refer to:

== Development of an organism's sex ==
- A sex-determination system, a biological system that directs the development of sexual characteristics in an organism
- Sexual differentiation, the development of sexual characteristics in sexually reproducing organisms in general
  - Sexual differentiation in humans

== Discernment of an organism's sex ==
- Determination of sex, the scientific or medical discernment of an infant's biological sex at birth
- Prenatal sex discernment, prenatal testing for the discernment of the fetal sex in humans
- Sex assignment, a colloquial term for the discernment of an infant's sex at birth
- Sexing, used by biologists and agricultural workers to discern the sex of livestock or other animals
  - Chick sexing, determination of the sex of newly-hatched chicks

== See also ==
- Gender, including biological sex
- Passing (gender), relating to the perception of gender, especially of transgender people
- Sexual dimorphism, a phenotypic difference between males and females of the same species, used in sex discernment
- Sex differences in humans
