= Chick culling =

Process of killing newly hatched chicks for which the industry has no use

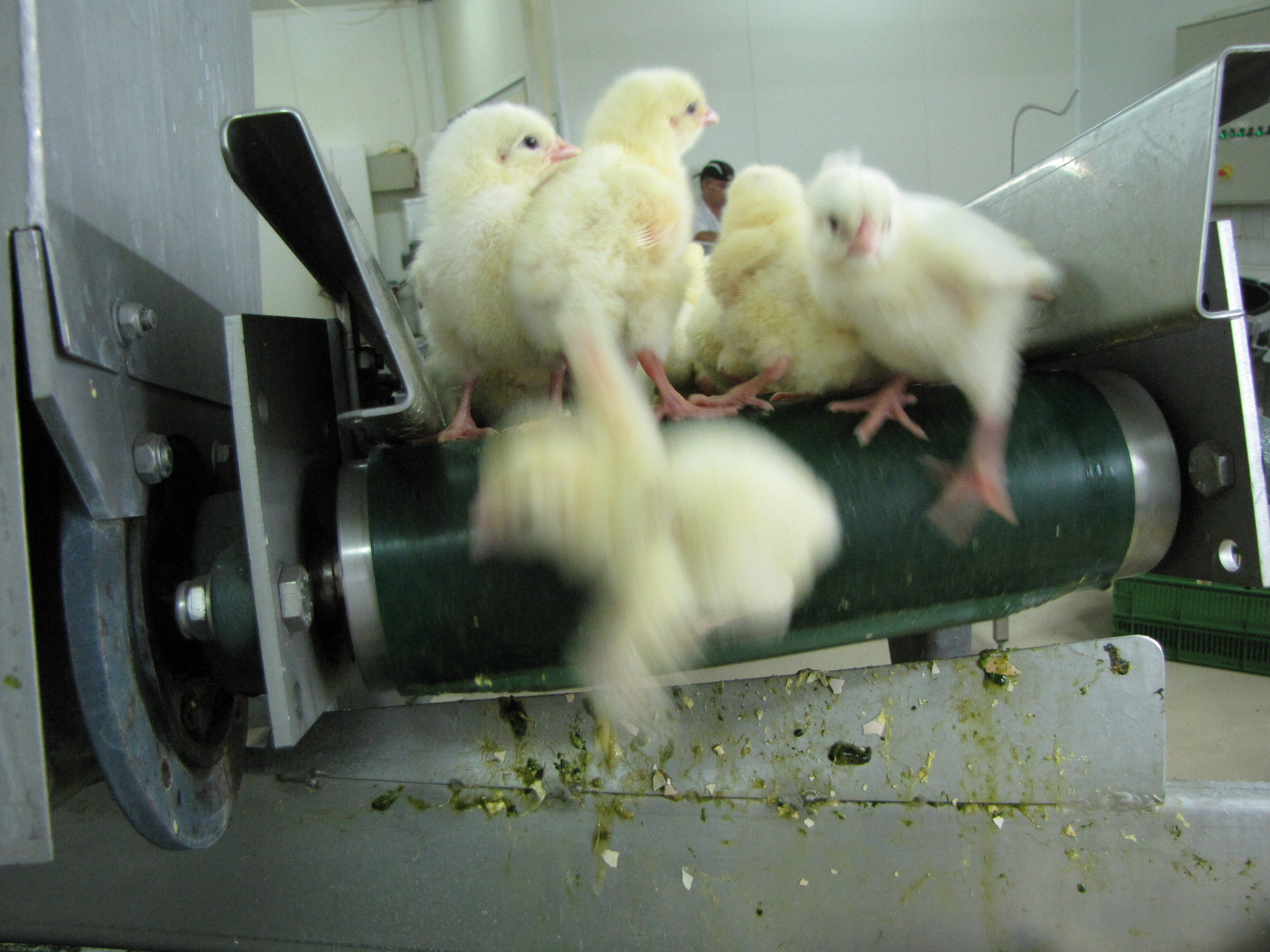
Male chicks on a macerator conveyor belt, seconds before they are killed

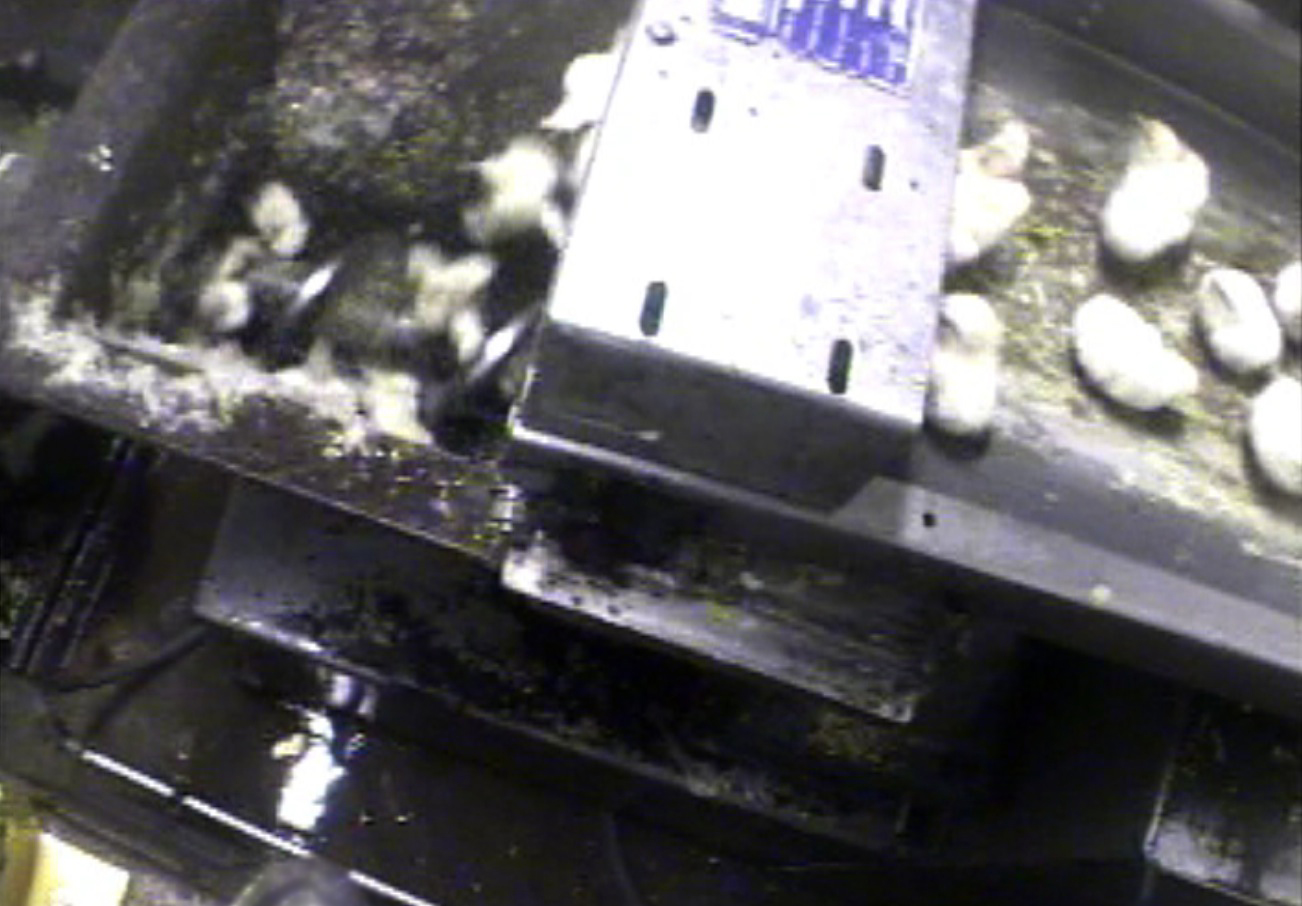
Chicks ground by a macerator

Chick culling or unwanted chick killing is the process of separating and killing unwanted (male and unhealthy female) chicks for which the intensive animal farming industry has no use. It occurs widely in industrialised egg production, whether free range, organic, or battery cage. However, some certified egg farms are eliminating the practice using in-ovo sexing. Worldwide, billions of male chicks are culled each year in the egg industry. Male chicks of meat breeds and dual-purpose breeds are typically spared.

Due to modern selective breeding, laying hen strains differ from meat production strains (broilers). In the United States, males are culled in egg production because males "don't lay eggs or grow large enough to become broilers." Because male chickens do not lay eggs and only those in breeding programmes are required to fertilise eggs, they are considered redundant to the egg-laying industry and are usually killed shortly after being sexed, which occurs just days after they are conceived or after they hatch. Some methods of culling that do not involve anaesthetics include cervical dislocation, asphyxiation by carbon dioxide, and maceration using a high-speed grinder. Maceration is the primary method in the United States. Maceration is often a preferred method over carbon dioxide asphyxiation in western countries as it is often considered as "more humane" due to the deaths occurring immediately or within a second.

Ducklings and goslings are also culled in the production of foie gras. However, because males gain more weight than females in this production system, the females are culled, sometimes in an industrial macerator. The remains of female ducklings are later used in cat food, and fertilisers. In total, billions of male chicks and up to 40 million female ducks per year may be killed in this way.

Because of animal welfare concerns, there is societal opposition to chick culling. In the 2010s, scientists developed technologies to determine the sexes of chicks when they are still in their eggs (in-ovo sexing) as an alternative to culling. Germany and France jointly became the first countries in the world to prohibit all chick killing from 1 January 2022, and called on other EU member states to do the same. Italy approved a law to ban the practice by the end of 2026.

== History ==
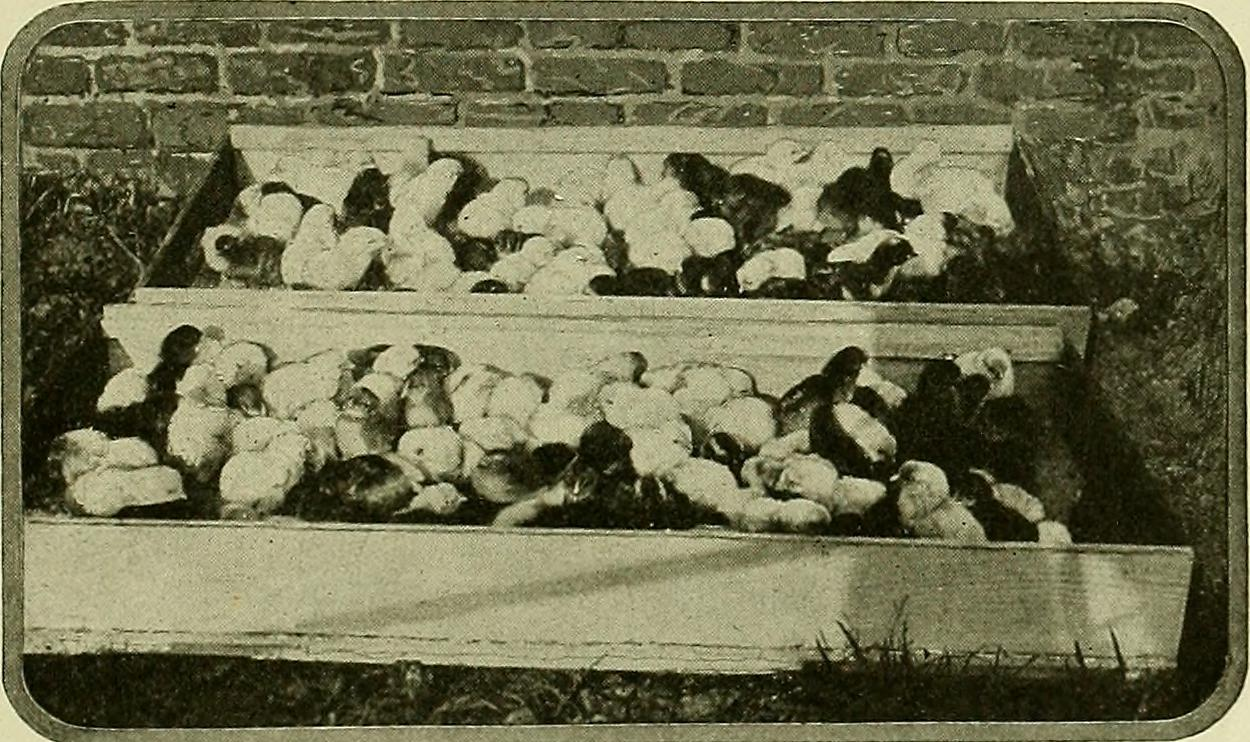
Chicks bred in the early 1900s

Prior to the development of modern broiler meat breeds, chickens were largely dual-purpose breeds, with most male chickens (cockerels) slaughtered for meat, and females (pullets) kept for egg production. However, once the industry successfully bred separate meat and egg-producing hybrids—starting in the 1920s and 1930s—there was no reason to keep males of the egg-producing hybrid. As a consequence, the males of egg-laying chickens are killed as soon as possible after hatching and sexing to reduce financial losses incurred by the breeder. Special techniques have been developed to accurately determine the sex of chicks at as young an age as possible.

In November 2018, the "world's first industry-scale production no-kill eggs" were sold to the public in Berlin, Germany.

Nowadays, there are commercialized technologies that detect the sex of a chicken embryo within the egg, called in-ovo sexing. These technologies such as Respeggt, In Ovo, Orbem, and CHEGGY, are gaining traction across Europe as they perform the sexing before the embryo can feel any pain.

== Methods ==
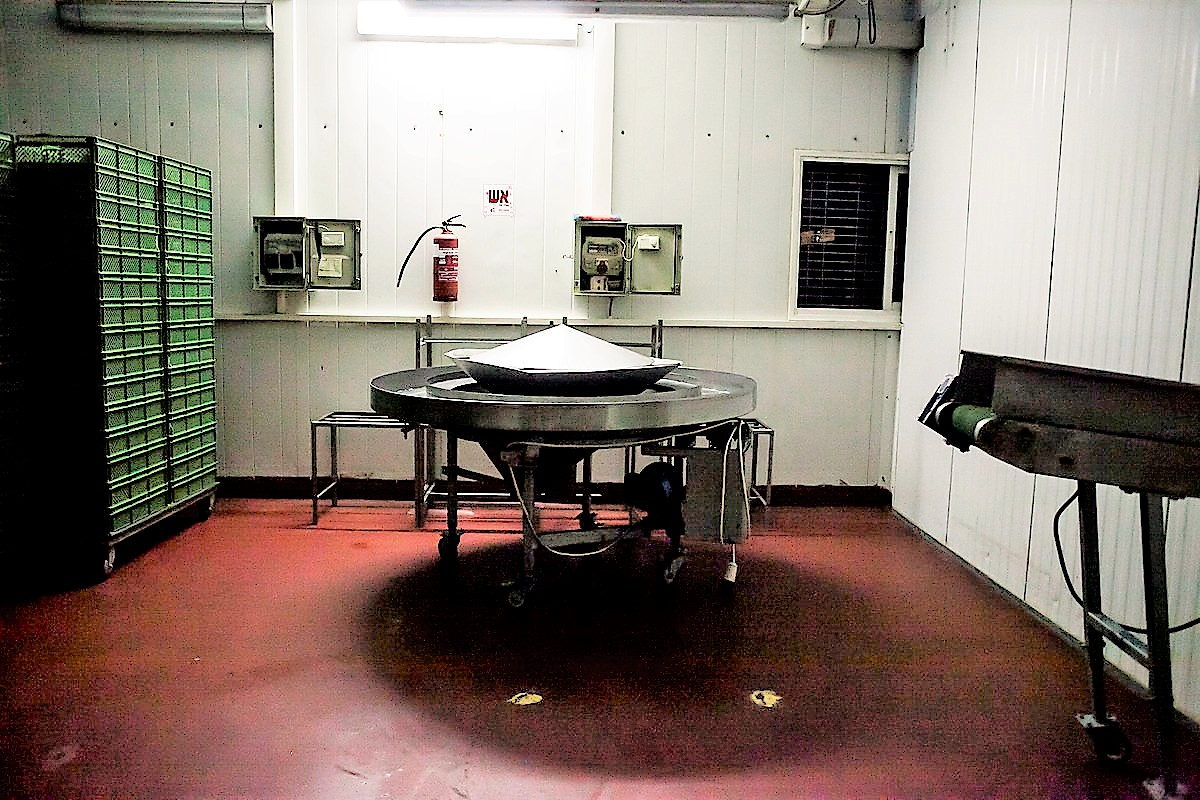
Chick grinding machine

Several methods are used to cull chicks:

- Maceration (also called 'grinding', 'shredding' or 'mincing'); the chicks are placed into a large high-speed grinder.
- Asphyxiation (also called 'gassing' or 'controlled atmosphere killing'); carbon dioxide is used to induce unconsciousness and then death.
- Cervical dislocation; the neck is broken.
- Electrocution; an electric current is passed through the chick's body until it is dead.
- Suffocation; the chicks are placed in plastic bags.

=== Permitted methods in the EU ===
Authorised procedures for killing chicks have been harmonised within the European Union. The regulations initiated in 1976 evolved in 1993, the first directive to specifically take chicks into account. A new directive was adopted in 2009, enacted on 1 January 2013 (replacing the 1993 directive) and last updated on 14 December 2019:

- "Use of a mechanical apparatus causing rapid death" (essentially grinding)
- "Exposure to carbon dioxide" (essentially gassing)

=== Recommended methods and standards in the US and Canada ===
The American Veterinary Medical Association (AMVA) "Euthanasia" methods include: cervical dislocation, maceration, and asphyxiation by carbon dioxide.

In Canada, the National Farm Animal Care Council (Conseil National Pour Les Soins Aux Animaux D'Elevage) publishes the Code of Practice for the Care and Handling of Hatching Eggs, Breeders, Chickens and Turkeys, (2016, amended from time to time), which is mentioned in the Health of Animals Regulations section 72.5(1) as the requirements and industry standards that must be met. The "code" defines the euthanasia as the "ending of life [...] in a way that minimizes pain and distress[..] and is characterized by rapid, irreversible unconsciousness [...] followed by prompt death" and adds that protocols including "irreversible stunning of birds prior to the final kill step may assist in effective euthanasia."

The 2005–2006 AMVA Executive Board proposed a policy change, recommended by the Animal Welfare Committee on the killing of unwanted chicks, poults, and pipped eggs. The policy states:

- 'Unwanted chicks, poults, and pipped eggs should be killed by an acceptable humane method, such as use of a commercially designed macerator that results in instantaneous death. Smothering unwanted chicks or poults in bags or containers is not acceptable. Pips, unwanted chicks, or poults should be killed prior to disposal. A pipped egg, or pip, is one where the chick or poult has not been successful in escaping the egg shell during the hatching process.'

The Code of Practice for the Care and Handling of Hatching Eggs, Breeders, Chickens and Turkeys, in Canada, lists the acceptable methods under the Appendix B, grouped as recommended on-Farm or at hatcheries, being:

- Manual euthanasia
- Non-Penetrating Bolt (farm only), Skull Penetrating Bolt (farm only)
- Manual Skull fracturing
- Decapitation
- Gas Inhalation (Nitrogen (farm only), Carbon Monoxide (farm only), and Carbon Dioxide)
- Manual Neck Dislocation, Mechanical Neck Dislocation (farm only)
- Industrial meat Grinders
- A combination of these methods.

The outcome expected being instantaneous death. For instance, the maceration must be "instantaneous and complete".

US producers announced in 2016 a goal of being able by 2020 to determine the sex of the developing chick long before hatching, so male eggs can be destroyed. However, in January 2020 they stated that killing day-old male chicks remains unavoidable due to the lack of a viable alternative.

== Statistics ==
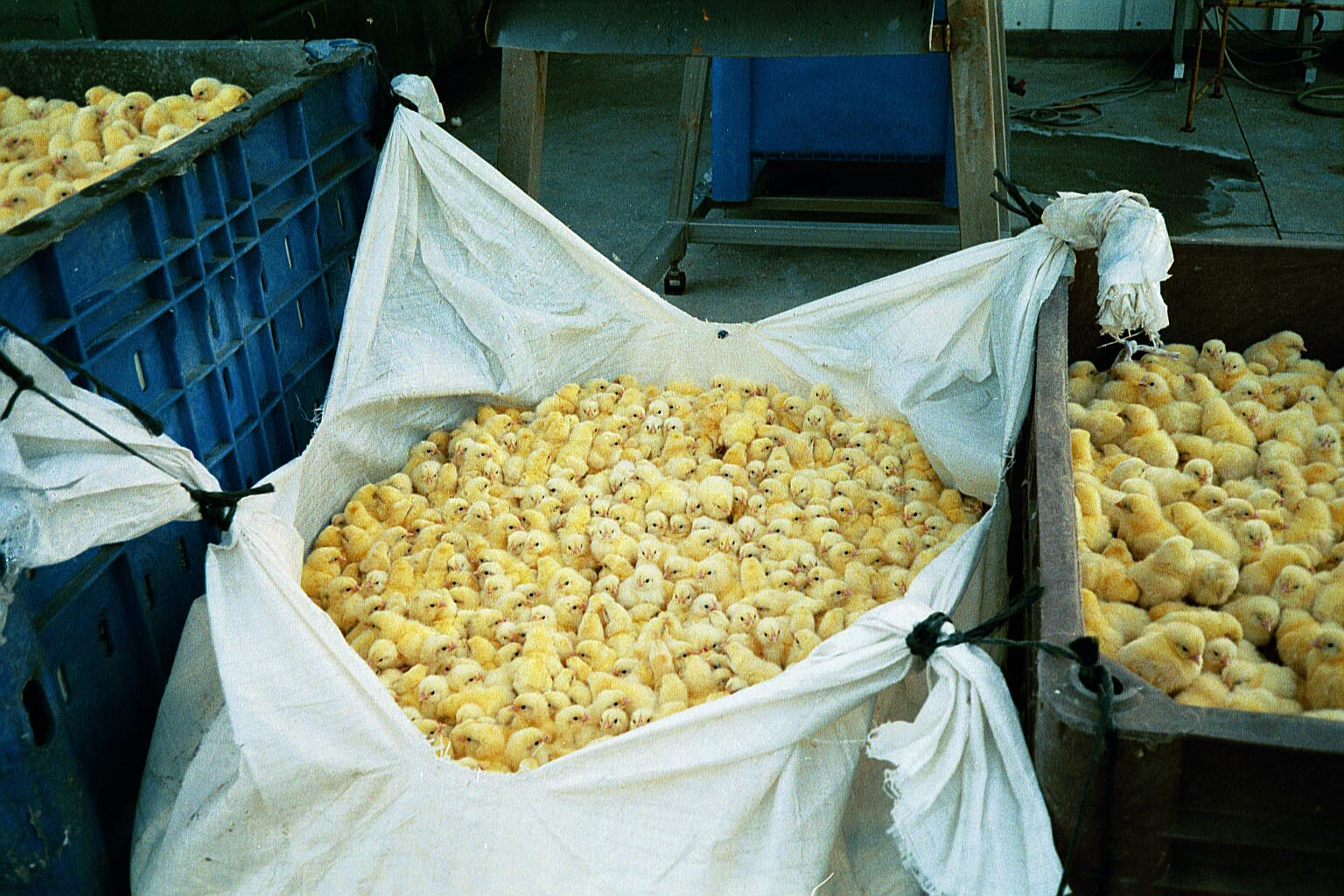
Male chicks prepared to be killed

- Worldwide: As of 2015, approximately 7 billion male chicks were culled annually around the world (2015 Poultry Site estimate). Other estimates include 6 billion (June 2016 SMH claim), 4–6 billion chicks (December 2018 The Guardian claim). According to In Ovo cofounder Wouter Bruins in October 2013, the top 20 poultry production countries alone culled 3.2 billion male chicks a year.
- Australia: more than 12 million male chicks are culled annually (June 2016 estimate). Maceration is the primary method used, but gassing is also used.
- Belgium: more than 15 million male chicks are culled annually, 40,000 a day (February 2020 estimate). CO_{2} gassing is the only method used and happens in two stages: chicks are first stunned and then killed.
- Canada: 22.5 million male chicks are culled annually, nearly 62,000 a day (December 2016 estimate).
- Czech Republic: 12 million male chicks are killed annually (September 2023), or 13 million (January 2023 estimate). By that time, most hatcheries in Czechia no longer used maceration, but only asphyxiation with carbon dioxide.
- Denmark: As of 2024, 'more than three million day-old male layer chicks are culled every year – including those from free-range and organic production systems.'
- France: Chicken culling is banned in France and about 16 million female ducklings and goslings are culled annually in the foie gras industry. Maceration is the primary method in both industries.
- Germany: Chicken culling is forbidden in Germany.
- India: over 180 million male chicks are culled annually (October 2014 estimate). Maceration appears to be the primary method, though suffocation using plastic bags has also been reported.
- Netherlands: Gassing is the primary method. Estimates of male chicks culled annually: 30 million (June 2008 estimate), 45 million (October 2010 estimate for the year 2009), 45 million (May 2016 estimate), 40 million in 2025, to be reduced to 33 million in 2026 (February 2025 estimate).
- New Zealand: 2.5 million (April 2001 estimate) to 3 million (June 2016 estimate) male chicks are culled annually. Maceration is the primary method.
- Norway: Over 3.5 million day-old male chicks are killed annually (2023 estimate), with maceration being the most common method.
- Poland: 40 million chicks are killed in Poland each year in the first three days of their lives because of their gender (2024 estimate).
- Spain: 35 million male chicks are culled annually (March 2020 estimate, February 2022 estimate). Asphyxiation is the common method; shredding (maceration) is not used in Spain.
- Sweden: A 2016 Swedish Board of Agriculture report stated: 'In Sweden, 5.6 million laying hens are replaced every year. At the same time, a similar number of cockerels are produced, the vast majority of which are killed and destroyed at hatcheries.'
- Switzerland: about 3 million male chicks are culled annually (September 2019 estimate). Gassing is the only method used; maceration was prohibited on 1 January 2020, but rarely used before that date.
- United Kingdom: 30 to 40 million male chicks are culled annually (November 2010 Viva! claim). A November 2010 Telegraph article reported on two undercover operations carried out by animal rights organisation Viva! showing a gassing-method hatchery and a maceration-method hatchery, both located in Preston. Both methods were reportedly 'legal and approved by both the Humane Slaughter Association and the RSPCA', with a British Egg Information Service (BEIS) spokesman saying gassing was used more often than maceration in the UK. In March 2015, a BEIS spokesman insisted that gassing was the only method used in the UK. An April 2025 RSPCA report stated that "It is our understanding that in the UK, all male chicks are currently being killed using argon gas."
- United States: An average of 350 million newly hatched male chicks are culled annually. Maceration is the primary method.

== Controversy and phaseout ==
Animal welfare advocates maintain that many of the current practices surrounding chicken slaughtering are unethical. Animal rights advocates argue that it is wrong to unnecessarily exploit and kill other sentient beings for food production, including chicks.

=== Scientific research into alternatives (2010s) ===
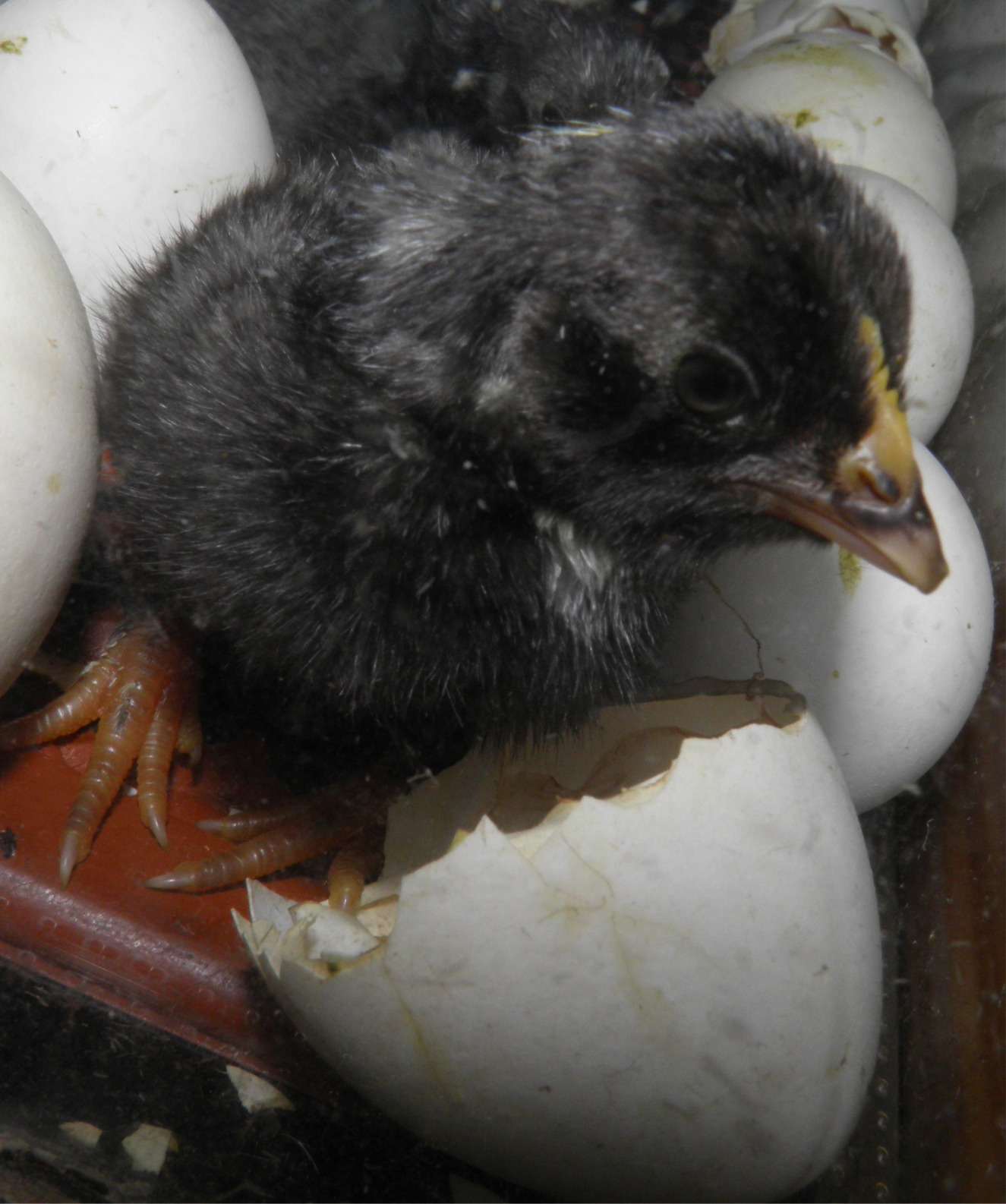
A female chick hatching

Several technologies may obviate chick culling by determining the sex of a chick before hatching. Some of these technologies rely on measuring eggs (through spectroscopy, chemical assays, or imaging); they can determine a chick's sex within 3-13 days of incubation. Some methods require genetic engineering to make male eggs fluorescent. Such methods are attractive not only for ethical reasons but to reduce the costs of employing human cullers and of incubating male eggs. Timothy Kurt, a director from the United States Department of Agriculture, said, "Everyone wants the same thing, and the right piece of technology could solve this right now."

A Unilever spokesperson has been quoted as saying in 2014: "We have also committed to providing funding and expertise for research and introduction of alternative methods such as in-ovo gender identification (sexing) of eggs. This new technology offers the potential to eliminate the hatching and culling of male chicks."

In 2015, the Leipzig University developed a method to determine the gender of fertilized eggs 72 hours after the incubation process has started. The procedure would use a laser to drill a hole into the eggshell and analyze the way the egg's blood cells disperse that light using near-infrared Raman spectroscopy. The hole in the eggshell would then be sealed again, and female embryos could be incubated as normal. Males would still be discarded, but earlier in their development.

In 2018, Agriculture and Agri-Food Canada, invested $844,000 to electronically "scan" fertilized eggs to determine if they are male or female.

In September 2019, the Foundation for Food and Agriculture Research, a company that was founded by the United States Congress in 2014 announced a $6 million prize for in-ovo sexing technology that could meet certain criteria. They awarded $2,113,915 of this prize to six entrants in November 2019.

CRISPR technology uses a "pair of molecular scissors" to illuminate the male chicks after being conceived and before being placed in the incubator to be hatched, thus eliminating all male chicks from being hatched.

In spring 2021, the Leiden-based Dutch company In Ovo presented the new in ovo-sexing machine "Ella", which had an accuracy of over 95%, which could possibly be upgraded to 99% in the short term. Its method of retrieving some fluid from the fertilised egg with a needle, and finding the biomarker sabineamine in this sample with mass spectrometry, takes less than one second to perform.

In late May 2021, a research team from the Technische Hochschule OWL based in Lemgo, Germany, claimed to be able to shine a laser into a small hole in fertilised eggs' scale, and derive its sex from the reflected light using fluorescence spectroscopy within six days, thus complying to Germany's legal requirement of early sexing from 2024. Startups including Respeggt and In Ovo responded skeptically, saying the publication of these conclusions seemed rushed, and that "many methods may seem promising at first, but aren't immediately useful in practice."

=== Legal challenge in Germany (2013–2019) ===
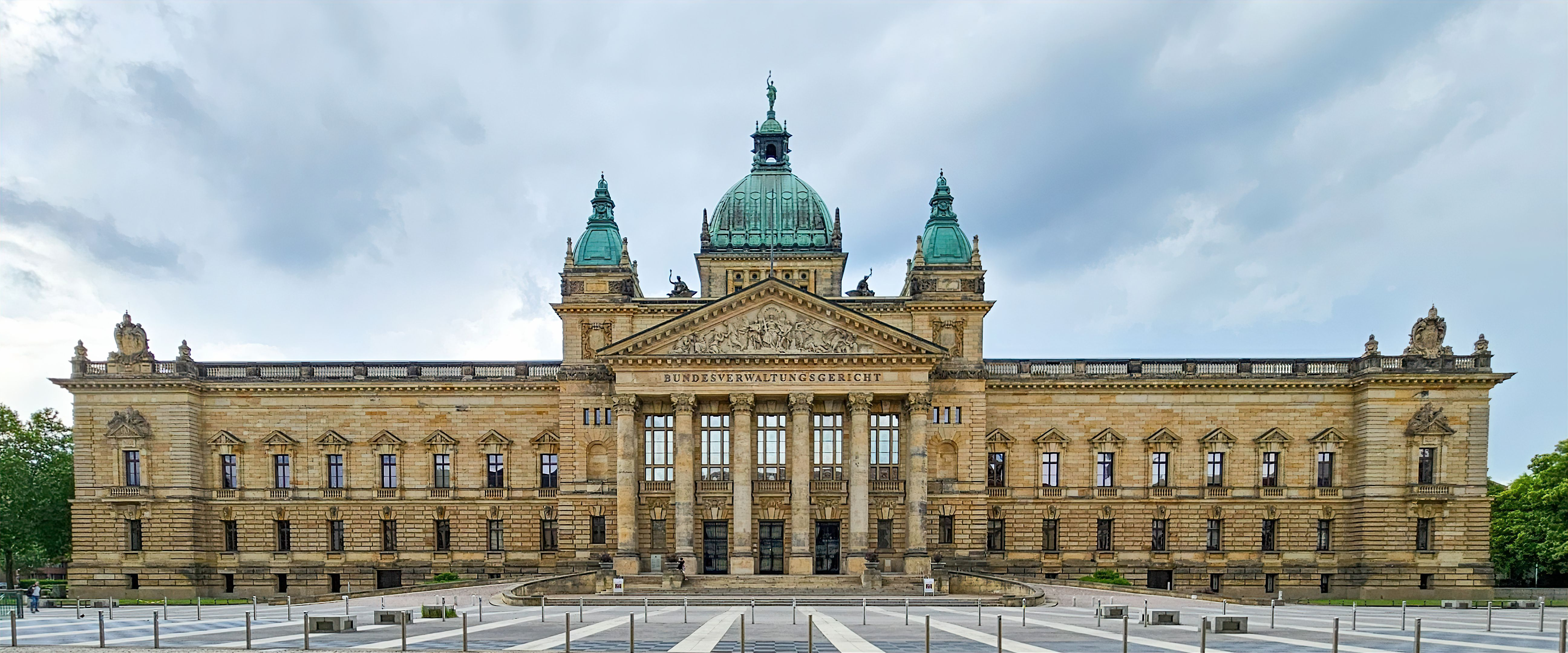
Federal Administrative Court

In 2013, the German state of North Rhine-Westphalia issued a decree banning hatcheries from killing chicks, against which two egg hatcheries in the state appealed. As paragraph one of Germany's Animal Welfare Act stipulates that "No-one shall inflict pain, suffering or harm on an animal without a reasonable cause," a lower court ruled that killing for food production was a "reasonable" ground. This led to a challenge in the Federal Administrative Court in Leipzig. On 13 June 2019, this court decided that the current way of culling chicks "violates the country's laws against killing animals without a justifiable reason." However, the court allowed hatcheries to keep culling chicks on a temporary basis until alternatives, such as sex determination in eggs, are introduced. Such "no-kill eggs" had been introduced into the German market in 2018 and were available in more than 200 shops by June 2019. As of June 2023, five companies have commercially available in-ovo sexing technology, which is estimated to be used for 15 percent of the European layer population.

=== Political efforts (2018–present) ===
Current global legal status of chick culling in the poultry industry: Ban on most chick culling Grinding (shredding) chicks illegal, gassing chicks legal Planned ban on all chick culling Chick culling legal, no ban planned No data

On 6 June 2018, Luxembourg amended its Animal Protection Act (Loi sur la protection des animaux, Deiereschutzgesetz, Tierschutzgesetz), including a ban on "eliminating animals for exclusively economic reasons", understood as covering killing male chicks and male calves in milk production. The government claimed Luxembourg to have been the first country in the world to prohibit these practices; although it appears these did not exist within its borders at the time anyway, it did set a legal precedent for other countries to follow suit.

In response to the June 2019 Leipzig court ruling, German Agriculture Minister Julia Klöckner stated chick culling was "ethically unacceptable" and argued it should be prohibited. The Grand Coalition agreement of March 2018 stated that chick culling should have been ended "by the middle of the current legislative period", which would have been in October 2019, but this goal was not met. At that time, gassing was the most common method of chick culling in Germany, which killed up to 50 million chicks a year. Although the federal government had already invested millions of euros in stimulating scientific research into two alternative methods for sex determination in eggs by then, these were still not ready for the market yet.

In September 2019, in Switzerland, the parliament voted to outlaw the shredding of chickens. This is despite this practice not being used in Switzerland. It was further commented that: "This tendency to rear species only for the production of eggs or for meat turns animals into mere objects. It has led to absurd practices such as the shredding of living male chicks". However, the practice of gassing chicks, which kills about three million male baby chicks in Switzerland per year, remained legal.

In late October 2019, French Agriculture Minister Didier Guillaume told France Inter: "We announced last week with my colleague, German Minister for Agriculture [Julia Klöckner], that we were going to stop the shredding of chicks, which is no longer bearable today. We said end of the year 2021." He further argued that the practice needed to be phased out and not immediately discontinued: "If we do it right away, what will happen? There won't be eggs anymore."

On 13 January 2020, during an official visit of Guillaume to Klöckner, the Ministers said in a joint statement that France and Germany wanted to end the mass shredding of male chicks at the EU level by the end of 2021. Guillaume stated that "France and Germany should be the European motor to advance on this issue", with Klöckner adding that Germany's EU presidency in the second half of 2020 was a good opportunity to do so. The countries planned to bring together various groups to share scientific knowledge and implement alternative methods. On 28 January 2020, Guillaume repeated at a press conference that the culling of unwanted male chicks (by shredding) would be outlawed in France by the end of 2021. While some animal rights activists welcomed the move, others said that the decision did not go far enough. The minister's entourage told Agence France-Presse that it was unclear whether his announced ban also included asphyxiation by CO_{2} (which was excluded from the Swiss ban), pressing him to explicitly prohibit that chick culling method as well.

In early February 2020, four Dutch animal rights organisations sent letters to Prime Minister Mark Rutte and the Parliamentary Commission on Agriculture urging them to follow the examples given by Switzerland and France, and phase out all chick culling including gassing in the Netherlands by the end of 2021. The Dutch Ministry of Agriculture cautiously responded that "a political solution is being explored" and that the Agriculture Minister would soon provide more information. In March 2020, the Directorate of Production and Agrarian Markets of the Spanish Ministry of Agriculture stated that it is working with egg producers to end the annual culling of 35 million male chicks in Spain in 2021. The Ministry said producers were testing two different techniques of in-ovo sex detection.

In July 2020, after appeals from PETA India that various killing methods used in the poultry industry were in violation of the 1960 Prevention of Cruelty to Animals Act, the government of Assam issued a directive to poultry hatcheries within the state to cease all illegal killing of male or unwanted chicks. By June 2023, multiple state governments in India had also started taking steps to curb this practice at the behest of PETA India. The animal husbandry departments of the states of Assam, Bihar, Chhattisgarh, and Goa had committed to adopting in-ovo sex determination technology once it became available in India, while Andhra Pradesh, Gujarat, Haryana, Jammu, Kerala, Madhya Pradesh, Maharashtra, Rajasthan, Uttarakhand, and Uttar Pradesh states had all issued orders similar to those of Assam to end all current illegal and cruel practices of chick-killing in the poultry industry.

Current legal status of chick culling in Europe: Ban on most chick culling Grinding (shredding) chicks illegal, gassing chicks legal Planned ban on all chick culling Chick culling legal, no ban planned No data

In January 2021, the German federal government approved a draft law banning chick culling, to be effectuated at the end of 2021. If passed by the Bundestag, Germany would become the first country in the world to ban this practice, confirming its joint commitment with France made in January 2020. On 20 May 2021, the Bundestag indeed voted to ban the culling of male chicks in Germany from 1 January 2022. Initially, the new German law also dictated that by 1 January 2024, all fertilised eggs in Germany must be sexed before day 7 of incubation, to avoid any chance of the embryo having consciousness and thus being able to experience pain. However, a further study conducted by the German government concluded that embryos do not feel pain before day 13, and the law was adjusted accordingly. This was a positive development for the in-ovo sexing industry, since many technologies can work before day 13, but not before day 7.

On 15 June 2021, the Dutch parliament by 81 votes to 69 adopted a motion directed at Agriculture Minister Carola Schouten to ban chick killing in the Netherlands. The motion, written and submitted by MPs Sandra Beckerman (SP) and Leonie Vestering (PvdD), stated: "[Parliament], noting that about 40 million male chicks are killed in the Netherlands annually because they have no economic value; considering that this is unnecessary because there are alternatives; considering that France and Germany are already introducing a ban; pronounces that the killing of male chicks should be prohibited." The same day, another motion by MPs Beckerman and Derk Boswijk (CDA), adopted by a much larger majority of 115 votes to 35, requested the government to inquire how, and how fast, a ban on killing male chicks could be introduced. The motion reiterated that the annual killing of 40 million Dutch male chicks was unnecessary, that France and Germany were already introducing a ban, and furthermore stated that "a ban in the Netherlands is desirable and must be done in a way that is good for animals, farmers and consumers." The Steering Group on One-Day Cockerels, set up by the Ministry of Agriculture after this, published two research reports in November 2022, which showed that the issue was complex and a Dutch ban on chick killing could not be introduced for the time being, but agreements were already reached between the Ministry and the poultry sector on structurally reducing chick killing.

On 8 July 2021, the Belgian region of Wallonia banned the broyage (grinding) of male chicks, but not the gazage (gassing); although welfarists criticised the lack of a ban on gassing, neither killing method has been practiced at businesses inside the Walloon Region.

On 18 July 2021, French Minister of Agriculture, Julien Denormandie, announced chick culling would be banned from 1 January 2022. Both maceration and gassing will be prohibited, and the French government would grant chicken breeders subsidies of 10 million euros combined in order to acquire in-ovo sexing machines instead (leading to extra consumer costs of about 1 eurocent per box of six eggs). Denormandie stated that two-thirds of the poultry industry was expected to have adopted these machines by the end of the first quarter of 2022. and must have them installed by December 31, 2022. On 21 July 2021, Germany and France made a joint declaration that called on other EU member states to prohibit chick culling throughout the Union; their call was officially supported by Austria, Spain, Ireland, Luxembourg, and Portugal. In December 2021, Italy's Chamber of Deputies first proposed plans to ban chick culling per 1 January 2027, confirming its decision on 3 August 2022, in part due to welfarists' campaigning since 2020.

Ukraine is seeking to catch up to EU animal welfare standards in accordance with the European Union–Ukraine Association Agreement (signed in 2014 after Euromaidan). Therefore, on 29 August 2022, the Ministry of Agrarian Policy and Food of Ukraine adopted Law no. #628 "On the approval of the Requirements for ensuring the well-being of animals during slaughter and killing" in order comply with EU Regulation (EC) No 1099/2009 "on the protection of animals at the time of slaughter", which requires stunning all animals before slaughter. Since entering into force, the legislation applies to new specialised facilities, and from 1 January 2027 it will apply to all slaughterhouses in Ukraine. Ukrainian poultry innovation researchers noted in April 2023 that the 2009 EU regulation might not be sufficient anymore, given new developments in EU member states such as Germany banning the killing of male chicks since 1 January 2022, and using spectroscopy for in-ovo sexing before the 15th day of incubation instead.

As of 12 October 2022, Austria and Luxembourg have banned the systematic killing of male chicks. In November 2022, Slovakia's Agriculture Minister Samuel Vlčan said there were no immediate plans to ban the slaughter of cockerels in his country: "We are more inclined to believe that we should find resources from the European Union to help breeders purchase technologies that will prevent the need to keep these roosters." Also in 2022 in Norway, a six-party majority in parliament called for research to end chick maceration in Norway. As the country's main egg producer installed in-ovo sexing technology installed in summer 2023, its first no-kill eggs entering shops in 2024, and its only competitor unveiled plans to open a new no-kill hatchery in autumn 2024 as well, it was expected as of April 2024 that the Norwegian government would adopt a national ban on the killing of cockerels in the future as demanded by the Storting. Per 1 January 2023, the Animal Protection Act of Austria added provisions, including "The shredding of living chicks is forbidden", as well as that out-sorting of in ovo sexed eggs was legal before 14 days, but had to involve stunning the embryo if done after 6 days. As of December 2023, in-ovo sexing had reached about 15% market penetration in the EU, but an EU-level agreement to ban chick culling altogether was not yet forthcoming. In September 2023, the Ministry of Agriculture of the Czech Republic said it was waiting for the European Commission to present a proposal before making any changes to national legislation. While animal welfarists in Czechia advocated a ban, several poultry breeders and zoo associations argued it might cause a problem for feed production for their animals. Similar to the Austrian exemption for feed production, the European Association of Zoos and Aquariums wrote in a statement: "If the killing of day-old chicks were to be restricted or banned, we recommend granting an exemption for specific feeding purposes."

With the adoption of the Flemish Animal Welfare Code in May 2024, chick culling was banned in Flanders in principle, but the ban would not take effect until a date to be determined:

Article 37. The killing of day-old chicks is prohibited.
The first paragraph shall come into force on a date to be determined by the Flemish Government. Such date shall be determined from as soon as sex determination of chicks in the egg is feasible for day 12 after incubation.
The Flemish Government may provide for exceptions to the prohibition as referred to in the first paragraph.

In 2024, Spain banned the slaughter of female ducklings in the foie gras industry. Back in 2022, the Spanish Ministry of Agriculture had stated: 'Spain is in favour of banning the grinding of male chicks, although this practice is not used in our country. We are supporting research into egg sexing methods that avoid having to resort to slaughter.' At the time, asphyxiation was the common killing method for day-old male chicks in the country's egg-laying and broiler industries, culling approximately 35 million male chicks annually.

In February 2025, the Dutch Ministry of Agriculture, the poultry industry and the Dutch Society for the Protection of Animals agreed to reduce the number of chicks killed with about 6 to 7 million annually in 2026; those would be replaced by in-ovo sexing. Critics pointed out this still meant 33 million chicks would be gassed in the Netherlands in 2026; thus, this effective reduction of 17.5% fell far short of the complete prohibition enacted in Germany, France and other countries. Meanwhile, in Italy, on 5 September 2025, the Ministries of Health, Agriculture and Business issued a decree, stipulating that "starting from 31 December 2026, the selective killing of male chicks of hens of the Gallus gallus domesticus L. species, originating from breeding lines for the production of eggs not intended for hatching, is prohibited". This confirmed the decision made by the Italian Parliament in 2022. According to Zielone Wiadomości ("Green News") magazine in January 2026, "the topic of killing chicks is not the subject of real legislative discussion" in Poland, because of a lack of knowledge about the topic; instead, attention is more focused on getting rid of battery cages.

In March 2026, the European Commissioner for Health and Animal Welfare Olivér Várhelyi expected to be presenting proposals by the end of 2026 for an eventual phaseout and prohibition of chick culling throughout the European Union. The Commissioner could not yet indicate how long the phaseout would take, emphasising the need to balance the protection of animal welfare with the practical and economic feasibility of in-ovo sexing technologies for poultry farmers, saying he was very impressed with the latest scientific progress made in this field. In addition, Várhelyi would 'take the differences in the economic situation in the various EU countries into account', as well as trade with third countries such as Ukraine and Brazil.

=== Business efforts (2018–present) ===
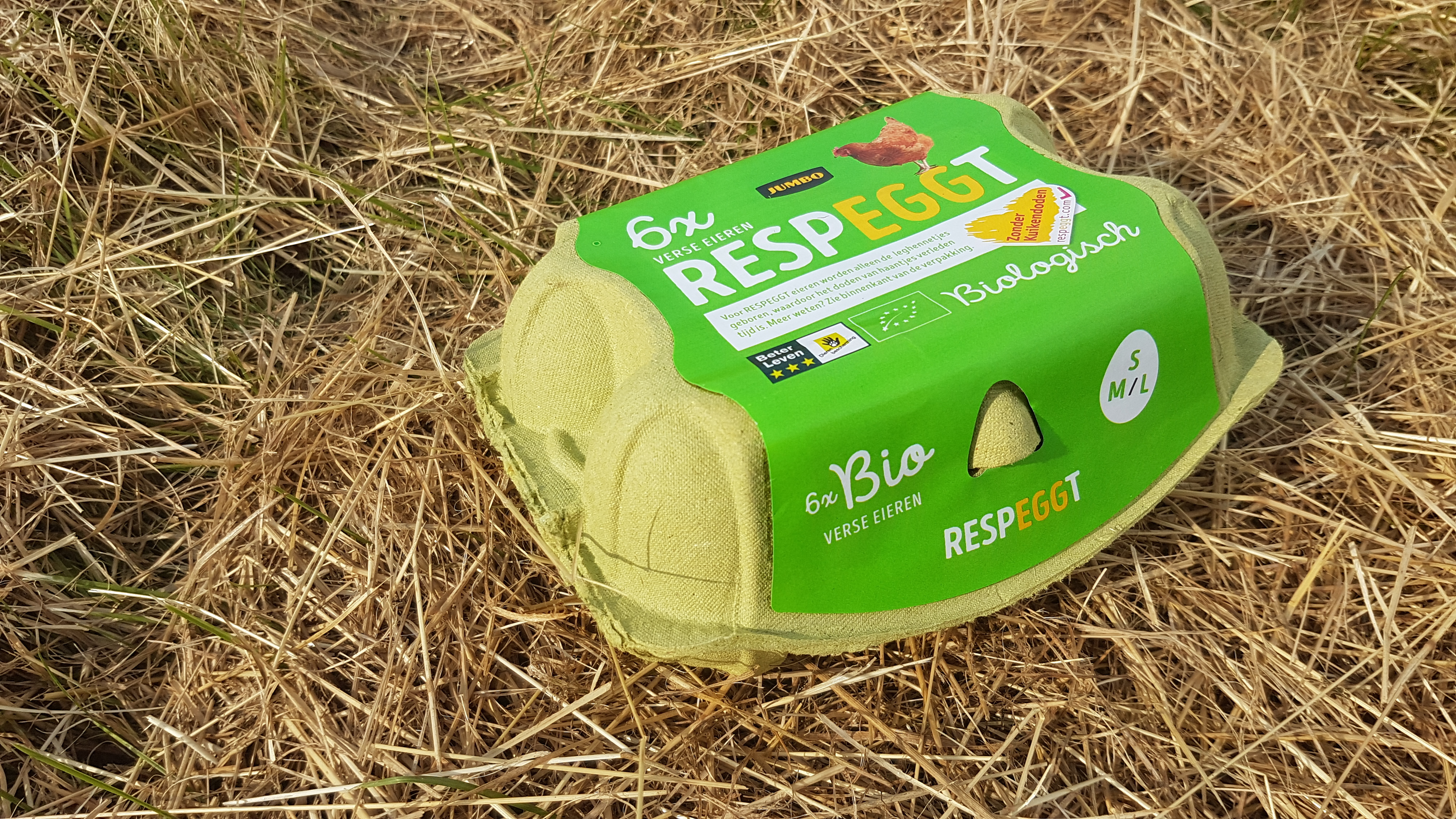
A sixpack of organic eggs with the Respeggt label, sold by Jumbo in the Netherlands, July 2021

Currently, the following businesses (producers, distributors and retailers) are in the process of introducing no-kill eggs (also called 'brotherless eggs') and phasing out kill eggs:

- German supermarket chain REWE is one of the main stakeholders of the Dutch–German Seleggt company that developed the first no-kill eggs. Under the label of Respeggt, these no-kill eggs were first introduced in 350 supermarkets and shops of REWE and Penny in the Berlin region in November 2018. By September 2019, Respeggt eggs were sold in 1,350 REWE shops.
- German supermarket chains Edeka, Marktkauf and Famila introduced brotherless eggs in 2019.
- French retail multinational Carrefour, Fermiers de Loué and German group Agri Advanced Technologies (AAT) introduced no-kill eggs in France in December 2019. On 10 February 2020, Carrefour announced it planned to mark the package of no-kill eggs with special logos, to have 20% of all its eggs sold without chick culling by 1 May 2020, and to completely produce and sell all eggs with the AAT method before the end of 2021. The number of Carrefour locations that sold AAT-style eggs grew gradually in the first half of 2020.
- In early February 2020, French egg distribution business Cocorette announced it would collaborate with poultry company Novoponto to produce no-kill eggs using Seleggt's technology.
- The German supermarket chains Aldi Nord and Aldi Süd announced in March 2020 they wanted to phase out chick culling in their entire chain before 2022. Aldi Netherlands was still considering its course as of May 2020.
- Dutch supermarket chain Jumbo was the first company in the Netherlands to start selling Respeggt eggs. Since mid-March 2020, all Jumbo supermarkets (more than 600 locations in the Netherlands and a few in Belgium) had them in store, and organic Respeggt eggs are planned to be introduced later in 2020.
- Dutch supermarket chain Coop (over 300 locations) will start selling free-range Respeggt eggs in September 2020.
- In July 2021, the Dutch in-ovo sexing machine companies Respeggt and In Ovo stated that in-ovo sexing was gaining momentum in Northwestern Europe, and major retailers were switching to it in anticipation of the German legal ban on chick killing. Generally speaking, the extra costs were not transferred to producers, but to consumers (at about 1 eurocent per egg in the case of Respeggt). Respeggt CEO Martijn Haarman stated: "The [poultry] industry is demonstrating that it has listened to society's desire to no longer kill male chicks. ... So now it's up to the consumer to decide if that higher price [of 1 cent per egg] is worth paying in order to prevent chick killing." Haarman also argued that the alternative of raising male chicks to roosters for meat was not economically viable, and "a step back both for animal welfare and the environment."
- Norway: In May 2023, Jæren-based company Steinsland & Co and Nortura, representing two-thirds of the Norwegian laying hen market, installed the first Seleggt in-ovo sexing technology in the country in order to sort out fertilised male eggs before the 13th day of incubation, with the aim of gradually phasing out all hatched chick culling in the future. The only other Norwegian egg producer, Salte Kyllingopdrett ("Chickenbreeding"), announced in December 2023 it was teaming up with two large feed producers (Felleskjøpet Rogaland Agder and Fiskå Mølle) to install a new no-kill hatchery with in-ovo sexing technology in Sirevåg, to be delivered in autumn 2024. Salte commented: 'This will result in a higher egg price in the shop, but we have no choice', in order to remain competitive with Steinsland/Nortura, as well as securing genetic diversity and reducing bird flu risks.
  In January 2026, an agreement was reached between Nortura SA and the Norwegian Meat and Poultry Industry Association (KLF) to phase out chick culling by 1 July 2027, after which only in ovo-sexing was to be used.

The following businesses are considering or have committed to introducing no-kill eggs and phasing out kill eggs:

- In 2016, United Egg Producers, representing hatcheries that produce 95% of all eggs in the United States, reached an agreement with The Humane League that it would voluntarily phase out chick culling by 2020, or as soon as it was 'economically feasible' and an alternative was "commercially available". In January 2020, UEP president Chad Gregory said "a workable, scalable, solution is not yet available", but remained "a priority and the right thing to do" and that the UEP are "hopeful a breakthrough is on the horizon". The Humane League president David Coman-Hidy was similarly optimistic about the technological progress made and remains confident that alternatives will be soon be put in place "in order to spare the lives of the estimated 300 million male chicks that are killed every year in the U.S. alone". As of March 25, 2021, according to a press release from United Egg Producers, the agreement had not been upheld. Therefore, UEP was not yet ready to switch to in ovo-sexing until the technology would be more scalable and efficient.
- Vital Farms, a producer of pasture-raised eggs and the second largest egg brand in the United States by sales, has said that they are committed to advocating for an end to male chick culling, and supporting alternatives that can be adopted at scale.
- Albert Heijn, the largest Dutch supermarket chain, with 1000 locations in the Netherlands and Belgium, stated in May 2020 that they are "meticulously monitoring the technological developments, and when it's operationally feasible, we will enable it".

A May 2025 research report from Innovate Animal Ag estimates that around 28% of commercial laying hens in the European Union were hatched with in-ovo sexing technology, 7 years after the technology was first commercialised in 2018. The increasing availability of in-ovo sexing machines in Europe allowed for the prevention of the birth and killing of the equivalent number of male chicks.

== See also ==
- Culling
- Chick sexing
- Gendercide
- Infanticide
- Neonaticide
