= Delayed feathering in chickens =

Genetically determined delay in first weeks of feather growing

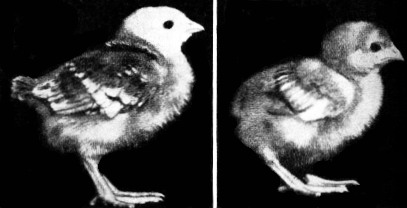
Figure 1. Feathering types in ten-day-old chicks. Left: Fast normal-feathering chick. Right: Delayed-feathering chick carrying sex-linked K gene

Delayed-feathering in chickens is a genetically determined delay in the first weeks of feather growing, which occurs normally among the chicks of many chicken breeds and no longer manifests itself once the chicken completes adult plumage.

The difference between fast normal feather development and delayed-feathering can be recognized in one-day-old chicks but is always more evident in 10- to 12-day-old chicks.

Female chicks have a slightly faster feathering than males. Barely seen in breeds with fast normal-feathering, this characteristic is better observed in breeds with delayed feathering, like Barred Plymouth Rock.

Natal down color is not related to feathering speed, but in chickens of full-black adult plumage, chicks normally have shorter natal down than those from breeds of any other plumage color pattern this shortening being more obvious in the head and back.

Feathering growth in the first weeks of life is genetically controlled by a few autosomal genes and a sex-linked gene.

Most of the phenotypical variation among breeds can be explained by the sex-linked gene K. Autosomal genes retarding feathering growth are not typical in any particular breed. Because those genes are recessive, they need to be in homozygosity to manifest themselves, but as poultry farmers dislike bad-fledged birds, autosomal genes only subsist in very low frequencies.

Contrarily, sex-linked delayed-feathering is very frequent, particularly in meat-type breeds like Brahma, Cornish, Cochin, Rhode Island Red, Wyandotte, Plymouth Rock and Orpington.

Sex-linked genetic variation has proven to be very useful for the sex identification of one-day-old chicks in commercial hybrids.

== Sex-linked feathering ==
Sex-linked feathering is controlled by locus K on the sexual chromosome, with four known alleles in the following dominance order: K^{n} > K^{s} > K > k^{+}.

=== K^{n} (extremely slow-feathering) ===
K^{n} ("naked") is the most dominant of the allelic series which controls feather growth rate. It is a gene whose action on feather growth is quite extreme. Birds carrying this gene are nearly naked during juvenile life and in some cases females remain nearly naked well into adult life. One-day-old chicks lack primary and secondary remiges (they may appear as extremely small pinfeathers, but always shorter than the coverlets).

K^{n} also has other pleiotropic effects, as a reduction in comb size and hypertrophy of the uropygial gland.

=== K^{s} (slow-feathering) ===
K^{s} ("slow") is another dominant allele of the allelic series which controls feather growth rate. In one-day-old chicks primary remiges are shorter than the coverlets. Plumage growing is greatly delayed during the first weeks of juvenile life, but birds of both sexes completely finish plumage growing at twelve weeks of age. This allele has no effect on adult plumage.

=== K (delayed-feathering) ===
K is another dominant allele of the allelic series which controls feather growth rate. One-day-old chicks have primary remiges and coverlets of the same length (see Figure 2B). In 8- to 12-day-old chicks rectrices are not yet developed (see Figure 1, chick on the right).

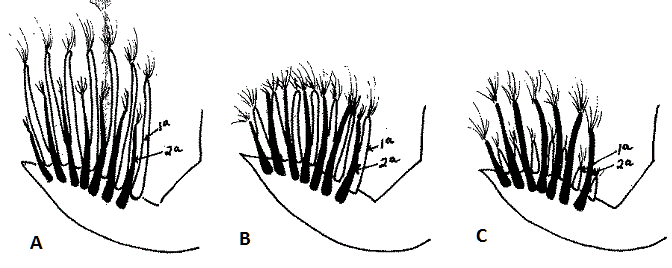
Figure 2. Feathering types Diagram of the wing of a one-day-old chick in dorsal view: A fast normal-feathering with the primary remiges (1a) longer than the coverlets (2a). B sex-linked delayed-feathering with the primary remiges (1a) of the same length than the coverlets (2a). C modified delayed-feathering with the primary remiges. (1a) shorter than the coverlets (2a).

Feather growth rate is generally slower in K-carriers than in fast normal-feathering birds. But this allele has not any effect on adult plumage. Sex-linked delayed-feathering is typical in many meat-type breeds.

=== k^{+} (fast normal-feathering) ===
k^{+} is the most recessive of the allelic series. One-day-old chicks pure for this allele have the primary remiges evidently longer than the coverlets (see Figure 2A) while 8- to 12-day-old chicks show their rectrices well developed (see Figure 1, chick on the left), and they later complete feather growing long before those chicks carrying K.

k^{+} is responsible for the fast normal-feathering found in most egg-type breeds like Leghorn, Minorca, Ancona and many others.

=== Practical use of the sex-linked variation ===
When fast normal-feathering k^{+}k^{+} cocks are mated to delayed-feathering K hens, the sex of all the descendants can be easily recognized at hatch: resulting female chicks k^{+} have fast normal-feathering (see Figure 2A) while male chicks Kk^{+} have delayed-feathering (see Figure 2B and 2C).

This happens because female birds have a single Z sexual chromosome, while males carry two, contrarily to what happens in humans, where the male is the heterogametic sex, as occurs in most diploid species.

k^{+} carrier females are always of the fast normal-feathering type, while heterozygous Kk^{+} males are of the delayed-feathering type because of the dominance of K over k^{+}.

This regularity found practical use in commercial poultry breeding to separate chicks of different sexes in the hatcheries, thus avoiding the inconveniences associated with vent sexing and making easier, faster, harmless and cheaper the sex identification in one-day-old chicks.

Through controlled matings and selection, K gene was put into egg-type breeds like White Leghorn, where sex-linked delayed feathering did not originally occur, thus obtaining genetically delayed-feathering female parent breeders to be mated with fast normal-feathering male parent breeders in order to obtain sexable female chicks of the fast normal-feathering type.

In meat-type breeds, feather sexing was not so extended to commercial broiler production because resulting poorly-feathered males are very prone to scratches in the skin of the belly, which can discredit carcass quality. After all, unlike egg-laying poultry, meat-type male chicks are not culled, so broiler males can be set apart later, once sexual differences become evident.

However, feather-sexing was found to be very useful in the reproduction of female parent stocks, which are usually raised separated by sexes. This way, both sexes of the resulting broiler are of the fast normal-feathering type.

==== Advantages of feather-sexing ====
Identification of sex in one-day-old chicks by feather length has a few advantages over vent sexing:

- Special sorting personnel is not required. While vent sexing can only be carried out by highly trained personnel, feather-sexing can be carried out by personnel without training.

- Risk of infection via sexing operative is completely eliminated, especially risk of infection by Escherichia coli due to manipulation.

- There is a lower probability of mistakes: when one-day-old females are sexed for breeding purposes there is less risk of males slipping through.

- Feather sexing is faster than vent sexing, reducing time required to dispatch the chicks out of the hatcheries. One can hatch more chicks per hour because one is not hampered by the drawback of vent sexing operatives being capable of sexing only a restricted number of chicks per hour.

- Some paraphernalia may be dispensed with, such as tables and lamps.

- The cost of sexing is much lower.

==== Disadvantages of feather-sexing ====
Feather-sexing can only be carried out in chicks resulting from the mating of fast normal-feathering males with delayed-feathering females, while vent sexing can be applied to any chicks. This means that feather-sexing cannot be applied to chicks of the same breed, unless geneticists preserve that breed segregating for both types of feathering and birds are strictly controlled for feathering type.

The preparation of new breeds to produce feather sexable crosses implies considerable previous genetic work which is completely beyond the means of most poultry farmers.

== Multifactorial autosomal slow-feathering ==
There are some multifactorial autosomal genes which affect only chicks with delayed-feathering and have no effect on fast normal-feathering chicks, nor on adult plumage.

The sole effect of multifactorial slow-feathering is to reduce the length of the primary remiges of one-day-old chicks without a concomitant reduction of the primary coverlets. That is, one-day-old chicks with primary remiges shorter than coverlets carry the K gene of sex-linked delayed-feathering (see Figure 2C).

== Autosomal T allelic series ==
Contrary to multifactorial slow-feathering genes, which affect only chicks carrying K, the autosomal recessive alleles t ("tardy") and t^{s} ("retarded") of the T allelic series affect only those chicks of the fast normal-feathering type. The dominance order is T (normal) > t^{s} ("retarded") > t ("tardy").

=== "Retarded" t^{s}t^{s} chicks ===
Fast normal-feathering one-day-old chicks have six primary remiges and at least another six secondary remiges (see Figure 3A). While "retarded" t^{s}t^{s} one-day-old chicks have normal primary remiges but only the first three (external) secondary remiges.

At 10 days of age, differences between normal and "retarded" chicks are even more evident. "Retarded" chicks show the first three or four primary remiges of normal length, with each new feather being shorter than the preceding one (see Figure 3B). At three weeks of age, "retarded" chicks have even fewer primary remiges than normal chicks, and only the first three secondary remiges reach the same length as primary remiges.

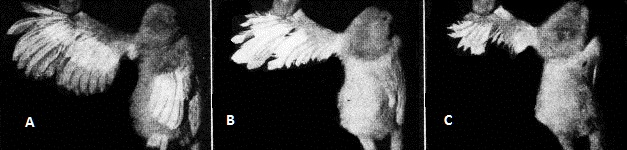
Figure 3. Effect of autosomal genes of T series on 10-day-old chicks. (A) Normal-feathering, with a T^{−} genotype. (B) "Retarded"-feathering, with t^{s}t^{s} genotype. (C) "Tardy"-feathering, with tt genotype.

=== "Tardy" tt chicks ===
"Tardy" tt chicks are more abnormal than "retarded" chicks. They show normal primary remiges at hatch, but lack secondary remiges. At ten days of age they still lack rectrices and show small or no development of secondary remiges (see Figure 3C). Rectrices do not appear until at least eight weeks of age. However, adult plumage is normal.

== Displastic remiges ==
There is an autosomal recessive gene dr which affects remiges and rectrices. Between the 8th and 28th day the feather follicles on several remiges and rectrices become enlarged and blood filled. The tissue of the developing feather becomes necrotic, and these feathers are soon lost.
