= Animal sex =

Animal sexes may refer to:

- Animal sexual behaviour, sexuality and sexual activities within animal species
  - Canine reproduction, the process of sexual reproduction in domestic dogs
- Animal husbandry, a branch of agriculture concerned with the day-to-day care, selective breeding, and raising of livestock
  - Selective breeding, the process by which humans develop particular traits in domesticated species by choosing which individuals reproduce
  - Sexing, determining the sex of animals in a farm or zoological context
  - Stud farm, an establishment for selective breeding of livestock
- Zoophilia or bestiality, sex between humans and animals
