= Battery cage =

Agricultural technology

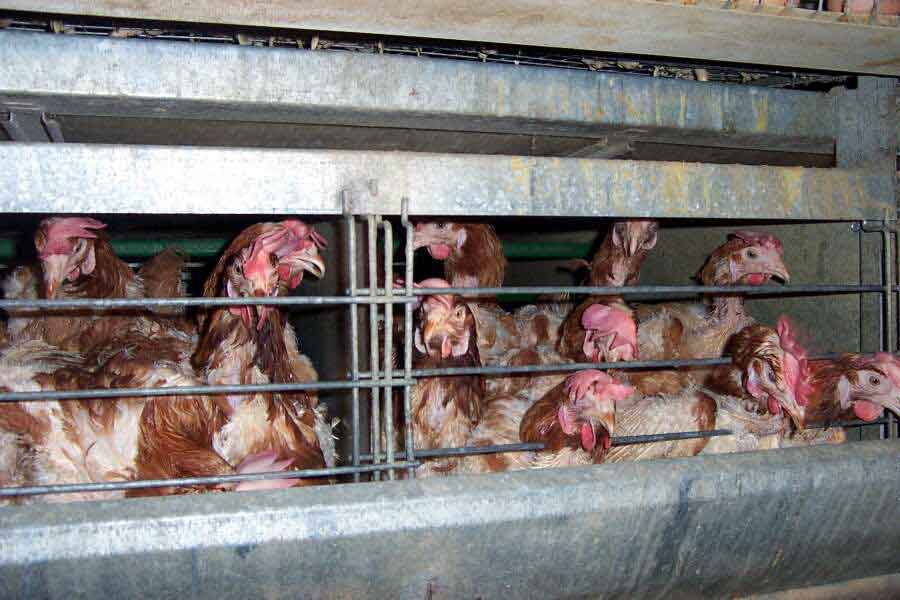
Chickens in multiple-occupancy battery cages

Battery cages are a housing system used by factory farms for various animal production methods, but primarily for egg-laying hens. The name arises from the arrangement of rows and columns of identical cages connected, in a unit, as in an artillery battery. Although the term is usually applied to poultry farming, similar cage systems are used for other animals. Battery cages have generated controversy between advocates for animal welfare and industrial producers.

== Battery cages in practice ==
Robotic cages are the predominant form of housing for laying hens worldwide. They reduce aggression and cannibalism among hens, but are barren, restrict movement, prevent many natural behaviours, and increase rates of osteoporosis.

The design of battery cages restricts the movement of hens and limits their ability to perform a range of natural behaviors, including walking, wing flapping, dust bathing, nesting, and foraging. The confined environment and lack of environmental enrichment have been associated in scientific studies with increased incidences of abnormal behaviors such as feather pecking. To reduce injuries resulting from pecking, beak trimming (also referred to as beak treatment) is commonly practiced in caged egg production systems.

As of 2025, approximately 54 percent of eggs in the United States were produced in battery cages, down from 95 percent in 2014. In the United Kingdom, statistics from the Department for Environment, Food and Rural Affairs (DEFRA) indicate that 50% of eggs produced in the UK throughout 2010 were from cages (45% from free-range, 5% from barns). According to the Royal Society for the Prevention of Cruelty to Animals (the RSPCA), in 2022, 28% of eggs in the UK were produced in battery cages.

=== EU ban on battery-caged hens ===
The Council of the European Union Directive 1999/74/EC banned conventional battery cages in the EU starting in January 2012 for welfare reasons, leading to a significant decrease in the number of eggs from battery cages in the EU. The 2012 battery cage ban was publicised as heralding an end to caged hens throughout Europe, but it created a widely held misconception that all laying hens in the UK are now either free-range or barn birds. That is not the case; although battery cages are illegal, farmers have skirted the ban by providing slightly bigger cages with "enrichment" such as perches. The hens in these conditions are now called "ex-cage colony hens".

=== Other examples of caged animals ===
Battery cages are also used for mink, rabbit, chinchilla and fox in fur farming, and most recently for the Asian palm civet for kopi luwak production of coffee.

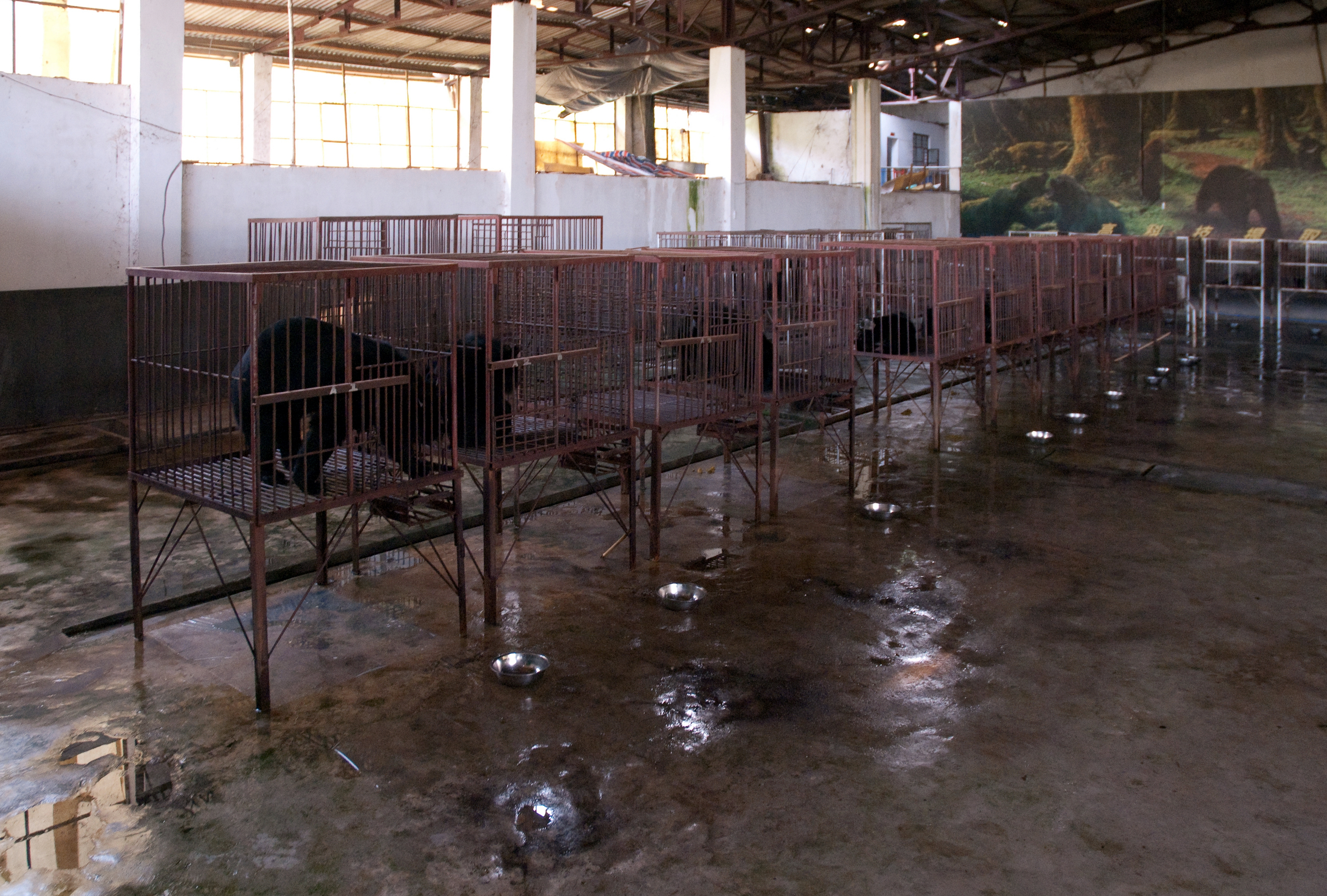
Battery cages for sun bears reared for their bile

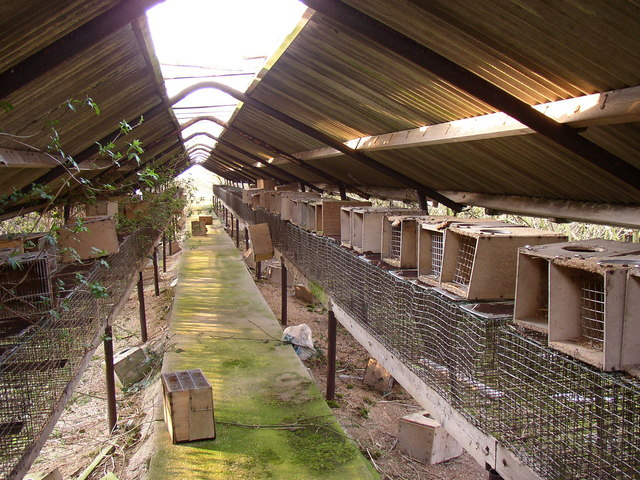
Battery cages for mink reared for their fur

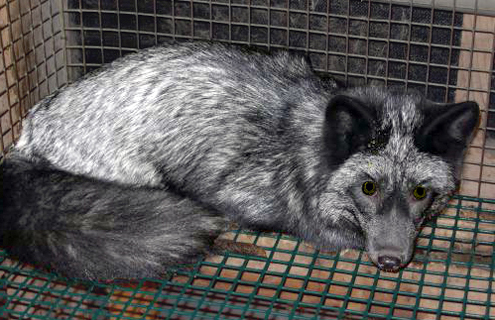
Battery cages for silver foxes reared for their fur

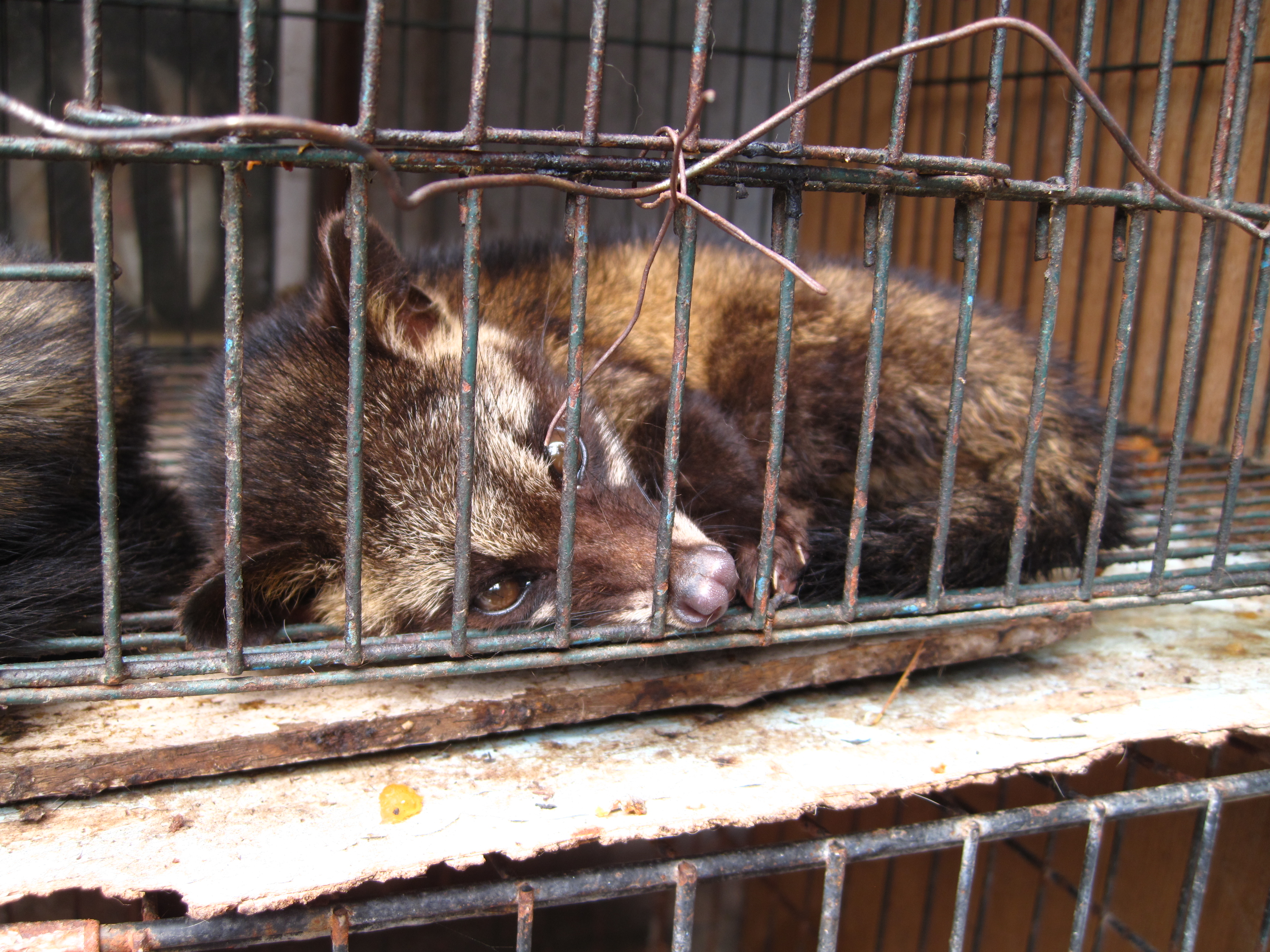
Battery cages for civets reared for kopi luwak (coffee) production

== History ==
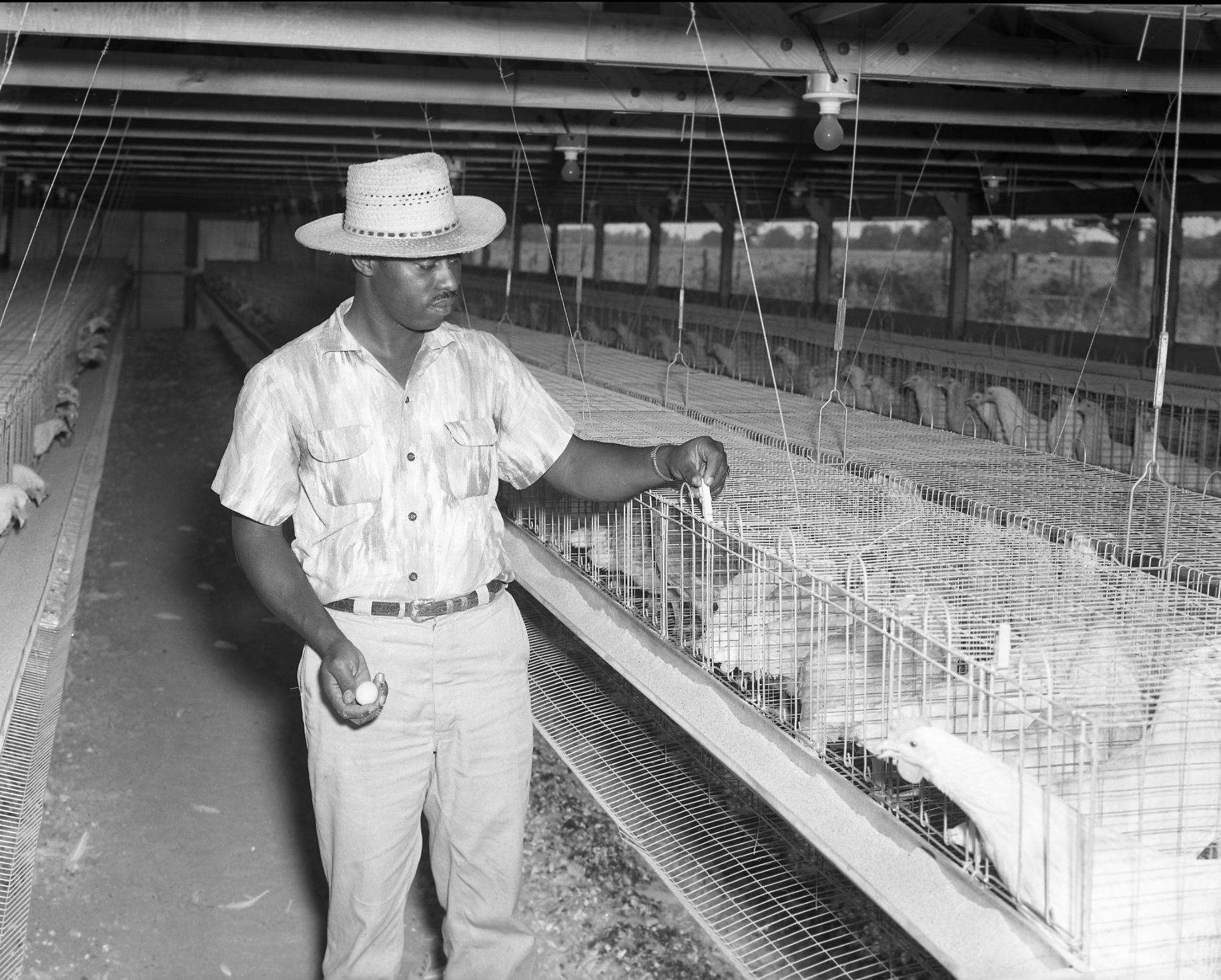
A chicken coop from the 1950s

An early reference to battery cages appears in Milton Arndt's 1931 book, Battery Brooding, where he reports that his cage flock was healthier and had higher egg production than his conventional flock. At this early date, battery cages already had the sloped floor that allowed eggs to roll to the front of the cage, where they were easily collected by the farmer and out of the hens' reach. Arndt also mentions the use of conveyor belts under the cages to remove manure, which provides better air control quality and reduces fly breeding.

Original battery cages extended the technology used in battery brooders, which were cages with a wire mesh floor and integral heating elements for brooding chicks. The wire floor allowed the manure to pass through, removing it from the chicks' environment and reducing the risk of manure-borne diseases.

Early battery cages were often used for selecting hens based on performance since it is easy to track how many eggs each hen is laying if only one hen is placed in a cage. Later, this was combined with artificial insemination, giving a technique where each egg's parentage is known. This method is still used today.

Video advertising the system in the early history of the battery cage

Early reports from Arndt about battery cages were enthusiastic. Arndt reported:

This form of battery is coming into widespread use throughout the country and apparently is solving a number of the troubles encountered with laying hens in the regular laying house on the floor.

In the first edition of this book I spoke of my experimental work with 220 pullets which were retained for one year in individual cages. At the end of this year, it was found that the birds confined in the batteries outlaid considerably the same size flock in the regular houses. The birds consume less feed than those on the floor and this coupled with the increased production made them more profitable than the same number of pullets in the laying house.

A number of progressive poultrymen from all over the United States and some in foreign countries cooperated with me in carrying on experimental work with this type of battery and each and every one of them [was] very well satisfied with the results obtained. In fact, a number of them have since placed their entire laying flocks in individual hen batteries.

In 1967, Samuel Duff filed a patent for "battery cages" in patent US3465722.

The use of laying batteries increased gradually, becoming the dominant method somewhat before the integration of the egg industry in the 1960s. The practice of battery cages was criticized in Ruth Harrison's landmark book Animal Machines, published in 1964.

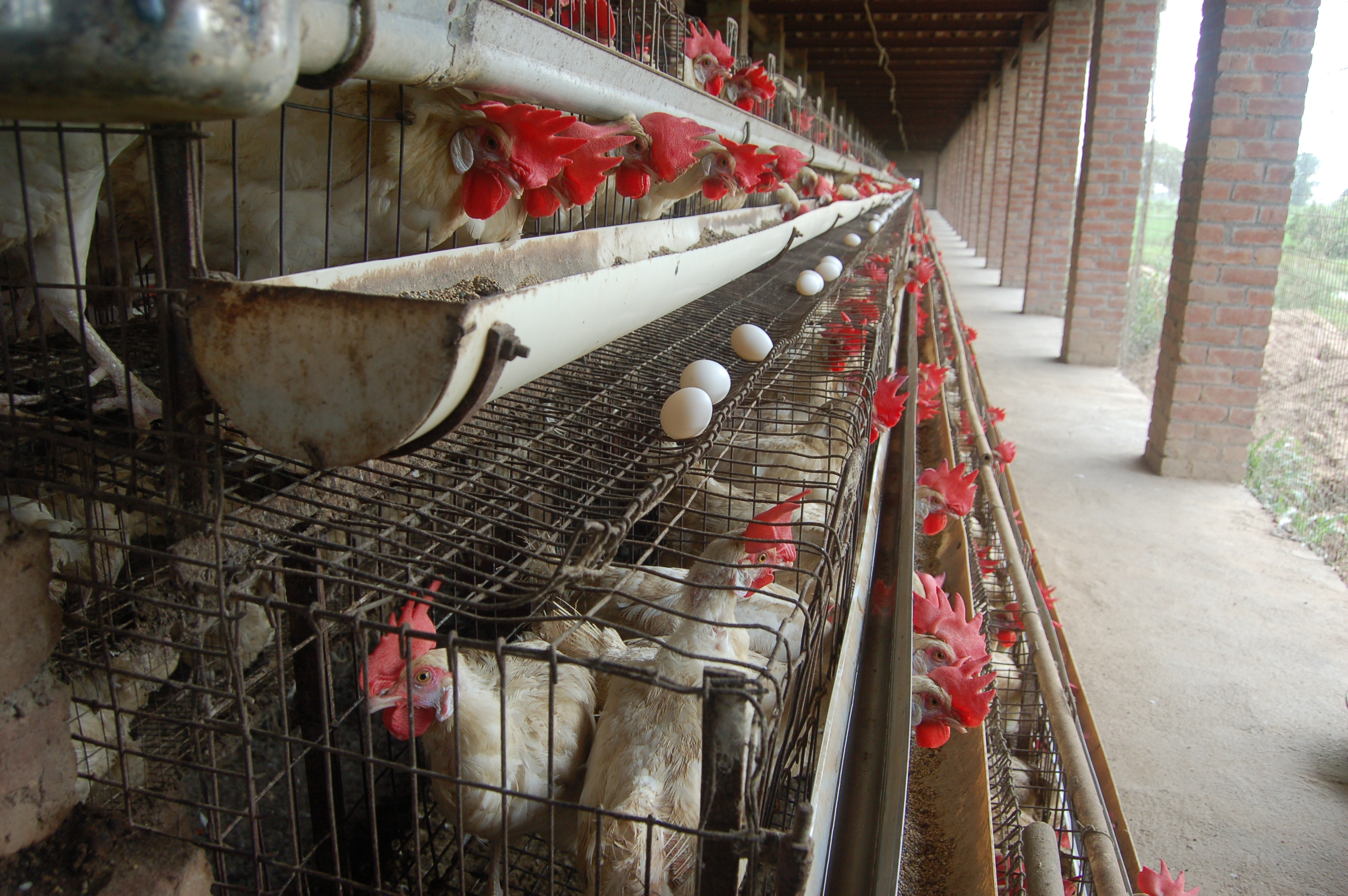
A simple battery cage system with no conveyors for feed or eggs

In 1990, North and Bell reported that 75 percent of all commercial layers in the world and 95 percent in the United States were kept in cages.

By all accounts, a caged layer facility is more expensive to build than high-density floor confinement but can be cheaper to operate if designed to minimize labor.

North and Bell report the following economic advantages to laying cages:

1. It is easier to care for the pullets; no birds are underfoot
2. Floor eggs are eliminated
3. Eggs are cleaner
4. Culling is expedited
5. In most instances, less feed is required to produce a dozen eggs
6. Broodiness is eliminated
7. More pullets may be housed in a given house floor space
8. Internal parasites are eliminated
9. Labor requirements are generally much reduced

They also cite disadvantages to cages:

1. The handling of manure may be a problem
2. Generally, flies become a greater nuisance
3. The investment per pullet may be higher than in the case of floor operations
4. There is a slightly higher percentage of blood spots in the eggs
5. The bones are more fragile and processors often discount the fowl price

Disadvantages one and two can be eliminated by manure conveyors, but some industrial systems do not feature manure conveyors.

== Legislation ==
World laws on battery cages Nationwide ban on battery cages Some subnational bans on battery cages Nationwide phaseout of battery cages in progress Battery cages legal No data

Efforts are being undertaken to prohibit battery cages in countries around the world, including Bhutan, India, Brazil, Costa Rica, and Mexico.

=== Australia ===
Attempts to change the law have been an object of contention; RSPCA Australia has been officially campaigning to abolish both battery cages and furnished cages and to prohibit the sale of cage eggs ever since the 2001 revision of the Poultry Code. The 2009 Code of Practice permits the use of battery cages. A written commitment by the Federal government to review the practice was scheduled in 2010; there was no further communication. During 2013 the state government of Tasmania was planning to phase out battery cages and budgeting for financial compensation for affected farmers but this was scrapped following the 2014 election.

The Australian Capital Territory prohibited battery cages in early 2014. The Greens were committed to also legally prohibit them in late 2014 in Victoria. In 2019, New South Wales Legislative Council member Emma Hurst established and chaired a NSW Parliamentary Inquiry into the Use of Battery Cages for Hens in the Egg Production Industry. The Inquiry recommended that all food products containing eggs from caged hens should be clearly labelled for the benefit of consumers, and a phase-out of battery cage hen farming in NSW.

=== Bhutan ===
Bhutan outlawed battery cages in 2012.

=== Canada ===
In February 2016, 90 percent of egg-laying hens in Canada lived in battery cages. That month, negotiations between egg farmers, animal welfarists, and the government resulted in a moratorium on construction of new battery cages from 1 April 2017 and a gradual 15-year phaseout of battery cages towards enriched cage or cage-free systems by 2036. Activist group Mercy for Animals was pleased with the announced phaseout, but called the timetable "simply outrageous" and argued that more urgency was required; some food companies such as Cara Foods, Tim Hortons, Burger King, McDonald's, Wendy's, Starbucks, and Subway restaurant announced they would phaseout non-cage-free eggs much sooner than 2036. As of 2024, 18% of Canadian egg production is cage-free.

=== European Union ===
In 1999, the Council of the European Union Directive 1999/74/EC banned the conventional battery cage in the EU in 2012, after a 12-year phase-out. In their 1996 report, the European Commission's Scientific Veterinary Committee (SVC) condemned the battery cage, concluding:

It is clear that because of its small size and its barrenness, the battery cage as used at present has inherent severe disadvantages for the welfare of hens.

The EU Directive allows "enriched" or "furnished" cages to be used. Under the directive, enriched cages must be at least 45 centimetres (18 inches) high and must provide each hen with at least 750 square centimetres (116 square inches) of space; 600 square centimetres (93 sq in) of this must be "usable area" – the other 150 square centimetres (23 sq in) is for a nest-box. The cage must also contain litter, perches, and "claw-shortening devices". Some animal welfare organisations, such as Compassion in World Farming, have criticised this move, calling for enriched cages to be prohibited as they believe they provide no significant or worthwhile welfare benefits compared with conventional battery cages.

Germany banned conventional battery cages in 2007, five years earlier than required by the EU Directive, and has prohibited enriched cages from 2012. Mahi Klosterhalfen of the Albert Schweitzer Foundation has been instrumental in a strategic campaign against battery cages in Germany.

=== India ===
In 2013, the Animal Welfare Board of India concluded that battery cages were in violation of Section 11 (1)(e) of the 1960 Prevention of Cruelty to Animals Act, and issued an advisory to all state governments stating that battery cages should not be used and existing ones should be phased out by 2017. This interpretation has been followed by several states and confirmed by several courts such as the Punjab and Haryana High Court (March 2014) and the Delhi High Court. Yet, some battery cages have been found to continue operating illegally after 1 January 2017.

=== New Zealand ===
On 7 December 2012, as part of a new welfare code for the poultry industry, the New Zealand government implemented a ban on the construction of new battery cages and initiated a ten-year phase-out of all battery cages in the country by 2022. As an intermediate goal, 45 percent of battery cages were to be removed by 2018.

=== Norway ===
In April 2010, the Norwegian grocery chain REMA 1000 decided to stop selling eggs from both battery and furnished cage hens by the year 2012, to coincide with the scheduled EU-wide prohibition on battery cages. Norwegian law followed EU legislation and on 1 January 2012 also prohibited battery cages (known as tradisjonelle bur or "traditional cages" in Norwegian), making furnished cages (known as miljøbur or "environmental cages" in Norwegian) the minimum legal requirement. Several more industry groups have decided to voluntarily phase out furnished cages as well, such as NorgesGruppen by 2019 and Nortura by 2024, while in April 2017 the Green Party proposed to ban furnished cages throughout the country by 2025.

=== Switzerland ===
Switzerland banned battery cages from 1 January 1992; it was the first country to impose such a ban.

=== United States ===
US States with bans on battery cages for laying hens Laws prohibiting battery cages Laws prohibiting battery cages and cage-egg sale Battery cages legal

As of March 2020, California, Massachusetts, Washington, Michigan, Ohio, and Rhode Island had passed laws banning the use of battery cages, and the former three additionally banned the sale of eggs produced in battery cages. Michigan's ban of battery cages and the sale of non-cage-free eggs in the state, adopted in November 2019, went into force at the end of 2024.

The passage of California Proposition 2 in 2008 aimed, in part, to reduce or eliminate the problems associated with battery cages, by setting the standard for space relative to free movement and wingspan, rather than cage size. This was followed by 2018 California Proposition 12.

Battery cages are illegal in Michigan due to HB 5127, passed in 2009, which mandates that certain farm animals have enough room to stand up, lie down, turn around, and extend their limbs, rather than being confined in tiny cages.

In Ohio, there is a moratorium on permits for the construction of new battery cages as of June 2010.

Oregon SB 805 also banned battery cages and set forth a transition to enriched colony cages, doubling the space per egg-laying hen. This law served as the model for a national agreement between the Humane Society of the United States and the United Egg Producers.

== Welfare concerns ==
There are several welfare concerns regarding the battery cage system of housing and husbandry. These are presented below in the approximate chronological order they would influence the hens.

=== Chick culling ===
Due to modern selective breeding, laying hen strains are different from those of meat production strains. Male birds of the laying strains do not lay eggs and are unsuitable for meat production, therefore, they are culled soon after being sexed, often on the day of hatching. Methods of culling include cervical dislocation, asphyxiation by carbon dioxide and maceration using a high speed grinder.

Animal rights groups have used videos of live chicks being placed into macerators as evidence of cruelty in the egg production industry. Maceration, together with cervical dislocation and asphyxiation by carbon dioxide, are all considered acceptable methods of euthanasia by the American Veterinary Medical Association. Consumers may also be appalled simply by the death of animals that are not subsequently eaten.

=== Beak-trimming ===
To reduce the harmful effects of feather pecking, cannibalism and vent pecking, most chicks eventually going into battery cages are beak-trimmed. This is often performed on the first day after hatching, simultaneously with sexing and receiving vaccinations. Beak-trimming is a procedure considered by many scientists to cause acute pain and distress with possible chronic pain; it is practised on chicks for all types of housing systems, not only battery cages.

=== Cage size ===
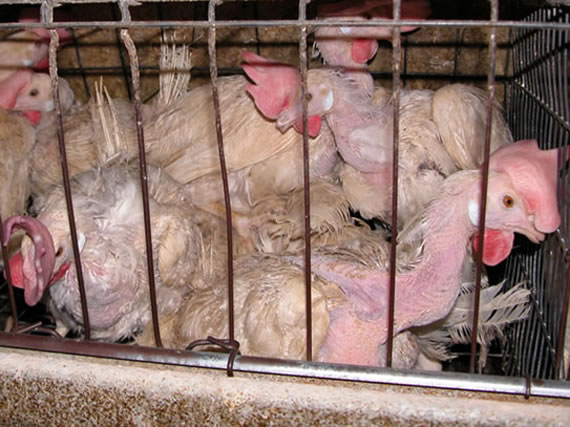
Battery cage

At approximately 16 weeks of age, pullets (hens which have not yet started to lay) are placed into cages. In countries with relevant legislation, floor space for battery cages ranges upwards from 300 square centimetres (47 sq in) per bird. EU standards in 2003 called for at least 550 square centimetres (85 sq in) per hen. In the US, the current recommendation by the United Egg Producers is 67–86 square inches (430–550 square centimetres) per bird. The space available to each hen in a battery cage has often been described as less than the size of a sheet of A4 paper (624 square centimetres (96.7 sq in)). Other people have commented that a typical cage is about the size of a filing cabinet drawer and holds eight to ten hens.

Behavioural studies showed that when turning, hens used 540–1,006 square centimetres (83.7–155.9 sq in), when stretching wings 653–1,118 square centimetres (101.2–173.3 sq in), when wing flapping 860–1,980 square centimetres (133–307 sq in), when feather ruffling 676–1,604 square centimetres (104.8–248.6 sq in), when preening 814–1,240 square centimetres (126.2–192.2 sq in), and when ground scratching 540 to 1005 cm^{2}. A space allowance of 550 square centimetres (85 sq in) would prevent hens in battery cages from performing these behaviours without touching another hen. Animal welfare scientists have been critical of battery cages because of these space restrictions and it is widely considered that hens suffer boredom and frustration when unable to perform these behaviours. Spatial restriction can lead to a wide range of abnormal behaviours, some of which are injurious to the hens or their cagemates.

=== Light manipulation ===
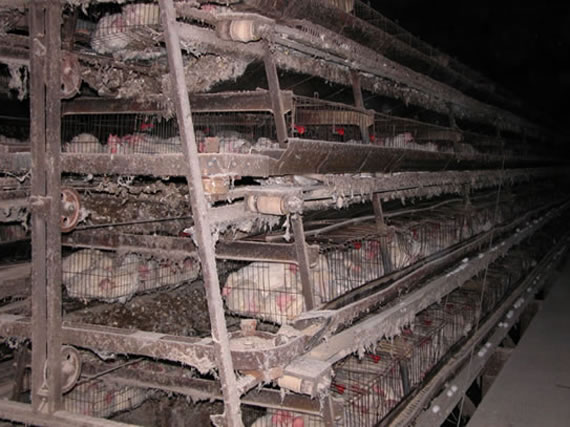
Battery cages – note the low light intensity beyond range of the camera flashgun

To reduce the harmful effects of feather pecking, cannibalism and vent-pecking, hens in battery cages (and other housing systems) are often kept at low light intensities (e.g. less than ten lux). Low light intensities may be associated with welfare costs to the hens as they prefer to eat in brightly lit environments and prefer brightly lit areas for active behaviour but dim (less than ten lux) for inactive behaviour. Dimming the lights can also cause problems when the intensity is then abruptly increased temporarily to inspect the hens; this has been associated as a risk factor of increased feather pecking and the birds can become frightened resulting in panic-type ("hysteria") reactions which can increase the risk of injury.

Being indoors, hens in battery cages do not see sunlight. While there is no scientific evidence for this being a welfare problem, some animal advocates indicate it is a concern. Furnished cages and some other non-cage indoor systems would also prevent hens seeing natural light throughout their lives.

=== Osteoporosis ===
Several studies have indicated that toward the end of the laying phase (approximately 72 weeks of age), a combination of high calcium demand for egg production and a lack of exercise can lead to osteoporosis. This can occur in all housing systems for egg laying hens, but is particularly prevalent in battery cage systems where it has sometimes been called 'cage layer osteoporosis'. Osteoporosis leads to the skeleton becoming fragile and an increased risk of bone breakage, particularly in the legs and keel bone. Fractures may occur whilst the hens are in the cage and these are usually discovered at depopulation as old, healed breaks, or they might be fresh breaks which occurred during the process of depopulation. One study showed that 24.6 percent of hens from battery cages had recent keel fractures whereas hens in furnished cages, barn and free range had 3.6 percent, 1.2 percent and 1.3 percent respectively. However, hens from battery cages experienced fewer old breaks (17.7%) compared to hens in barn (69.1%), free-range (59.8%) and furnished cages (31.7%).

=== Forced moulting ===
Flocks are sometimes force moulted, rather than being slaughtered, to reinvigorate egg-laying. This involves complete withdrawal of food (and sometimes water) for seven to fourteen days or sufficiently long to cause a body weight loss of 25 to 35 percent. This stimulates the hen to lose her feathers, but also reinvigorates egg-production. Some flocks may be force moulted several times. In 2003, more than 75 percent of all flocks were moulted in the US. This temporary starving of the hens is seen as inhumane and is the main point of objection by critics and opponents of the practice. The alternative most often employed is to slaughter the hens instead of moulting them.

== Improving welfare for egg-producing hens ==
The Scientific Veterinary Committee of the European Commission stated that "enriched cages and well-designed non-cage systems have already been shown to have a number of welfare advantages over battery systems in their present form". Supporters of battery husbandry contend that alternative systems such as free range also have welfare problems, such as increases in cannibalism, feather pecking and vent pecking. A recent review of welfare in battery cages made the point that such welfare issues are problems of management, unlike the issues of behavioural deprivation, which are inherent in a system that keeps hens in such cramped and barren conditions. Free-range egg producers can limit or eliminate injurious pecking, particularly feather pecking, through such strategies as providing environmental enrichment, feeding mash instead of pellets, keeping roosters in with the hens, and arranging nest boxes so hens are not exposed to each other's vents; similar strategies are more restricted or impossible in battery cages.

== See also ==
- Animal rights
- Animal welfare
- Open rescue
- Pastured-raised (poultry)
