= In ovo =

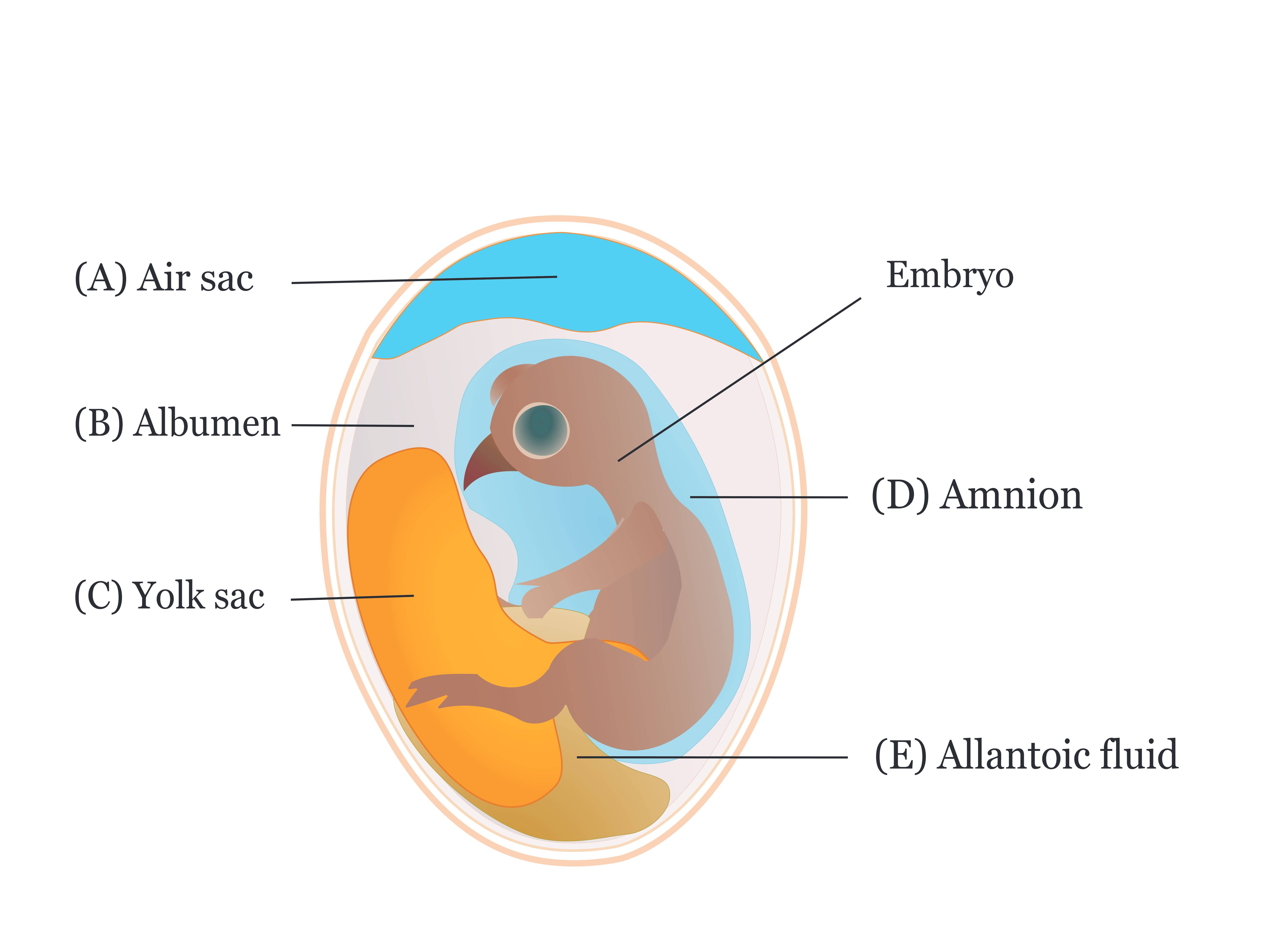
The bioactive compounds could be injected into the egg via air sac, albumen, yolk sac, amnion, and allantoic fluid.

In ovo is Latin for in the egg. In medical usage it refers to the growth of live virus in chicken egg embryos for vaccine development for human use, as well as an effective method for vaccination of poultry against various Avian influenza and coronaviruses. During the incubation period, the virus replicates in the cells that make up the chorioallantoic membrane.

== Advantages ==
In human vaccine development, the main advantage is rapid propagation, and high yield, of viruses for vaccine production. This method is most commonly used for growth of influenza virus, both attenuated vaccine and inactivated vaccine forms. It is recommended by the World Health Organization in managing influenza pandemics because it is high-yield and cost effective.

In poultry, In ovo vaccination improves hatchability and efficient protection against Avian influenza (AI), Newcastle disease (ND) and Coronaviruses (Av-CoV). Seroconversion rates of chickens vaccinated as embryos ranged from 27% to 100% with ND vaccination and 85% to 100% for AI vaccination. The birds are protected before delivery to a commercial operation such as a farm, thus preventing the spread of Avian viruses.

== In Ovo Vaccination ==
In ovo vaccination is carried out by machines. These machines perform a number of actions to ensure good vaccination of the chick inside the egg. Benefits of in ovo vaccination include avoidance of bird stress, controlled hygienic conditions, and earlier immunity with less interference from maternal antibodies.

This practice has been used in the broiler chicken industry, but recent adoption of in-ovo sexing technology in the layer industry has also made it possible for layer hens.

== Feeding ==
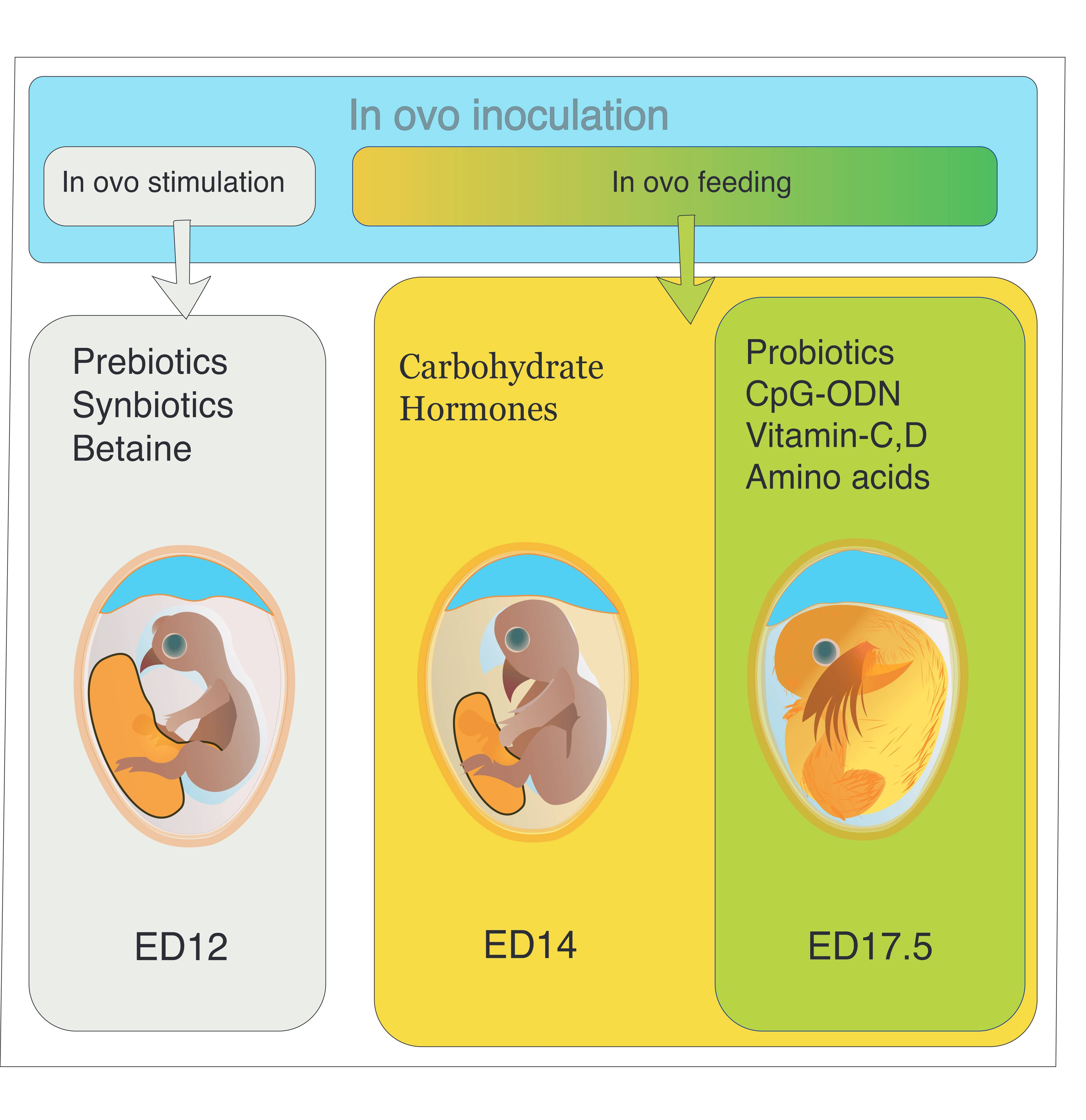
The in ovo inoculations could be aimed to stimulate or feed the embryos

In ovo feeding is a considered as a potential tool to provide nutrient to embryo as well as to modulate performance and gut health of pre and post hatched chicks. Based on the purpose the in ovo injection could be considered as in ovo stimulation or in ovo feeding.

== See also ==
- In-ovo sexing
- Vaccine
- Polio vaccine
- List of vaccine ingredients
- List of vaccine topics
- Virosome
