= In-ovo sexing =

Method to determine the sex of chickens

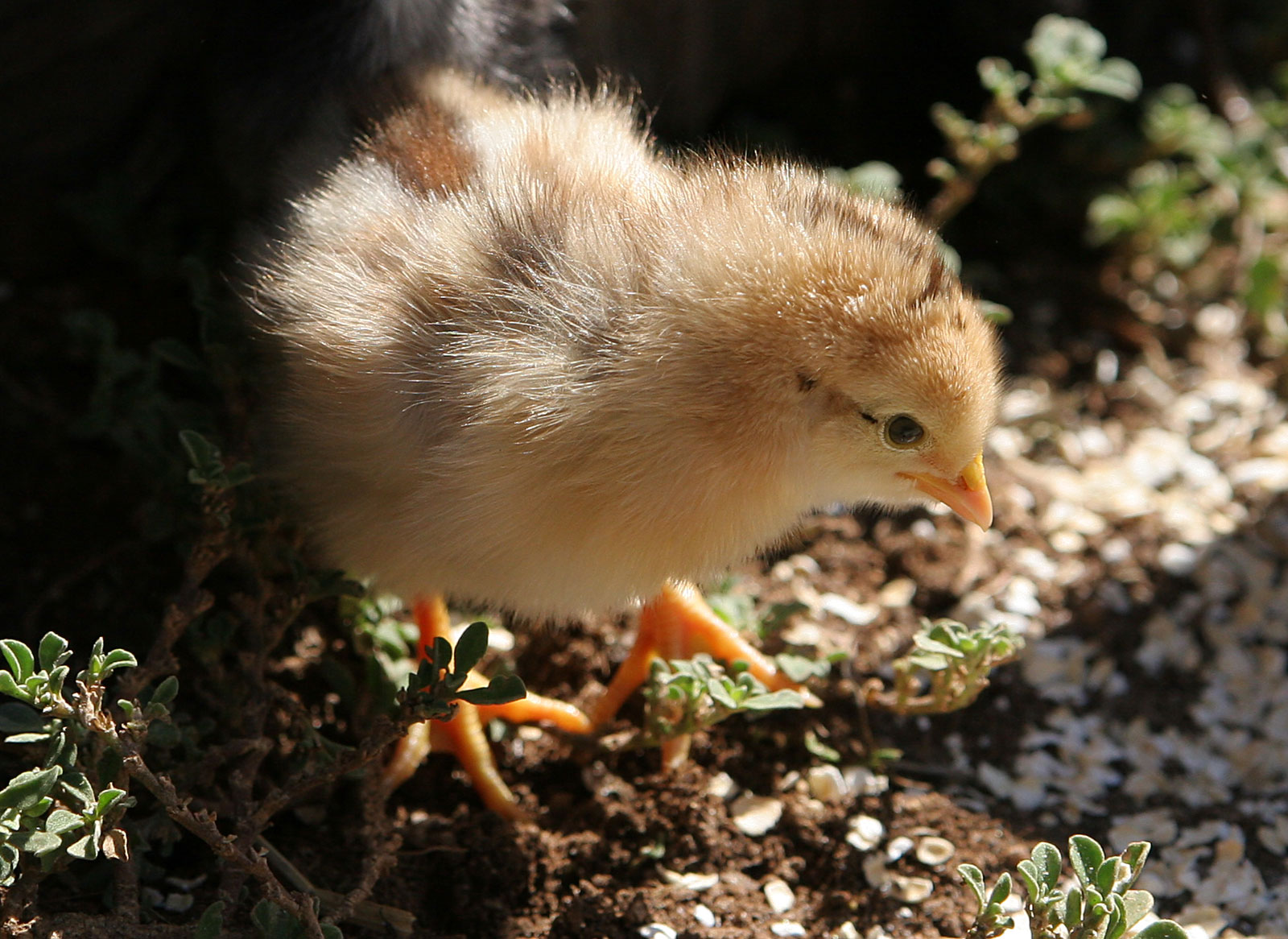
Chick

In poultry farming, in-ovo sexing is method for determining the sex of a chick while it is still in ovo (Latin for "inside the egg"). There are various methods to determine a chick's sex in the 21-day incubation period before it hatches.

In-ovo sexing technology has branched into two categories, DNA based and Image based. The first technology to be successfully commercially introduced for poultry farming was bio-marker detection through the Dutch–German company Seleggt in November 2018. Meanwhile, image based in-ovo sexing technologies have been introduced to the market by the German start-up Orbem and AAT, a subsidiary of the EW Group.

== History ==
=== Background ===
In-ovo sexing is a method of culling male chicks, before they hatch, though the industry often prefers terms that make this less apparent, such as "pre-hatching selection" or "sex identification". Historically, the term refers to culling male chicks, by direct physical inspection, after they hatch. Generally, in this article, "culling" is used in its historical sense, to refer to male culling after hatching.

Now that it has become possible to cull male chicks prior to hatching, the tradition practice of culling male chicks after they hatch raises new ethical problems. Modern poultry farming divides chickens into two genetic breeds: layers, which are raised for eggs, and broilers, which are raised for meat. Male layers have low economic value, as they cannot lay eggs and are less suited for meat production than broilers. As a result, many chick hatcheries opt to cull their male layer chicks as a cheaper alternative to raising them. Under conventional practices the male and female chicks are manually separated by human sexers on the same day they hatch. The female chicks are then transported to rearing and laying farms to be raised as egg-laying hens, while the male chicks are culled. It is estimated that 7 billion one-day-old male chicks are killed each year through chick culling.

=== Benefits of in-ovo sexing ===
By enabling producers to identify and remove male eggs before they hatch, in-ovo sexing offers a solution to chick culling. Unhatched male eggs can be used for different purposes, such as alternative high-value protein sources. In addition to its welfare benefits, in-ovo sexing offers some economic benefits. It allows producers to avoid wasting energy and incubator space on unwanted eggs. And by limiting the egg pool to only females, it makes other technological interventions like on-farm hatching and in-ovo vaccination more cost-effective.

=== Male-chick culling ban ===
Several European countries have passed laws to restrict chick culling. In January 2021, Germany was the first country to successfully outlaw the practice. A few months later, France also banned the one-day-old male chick slaughter. In 2022, the third country, Italy, followed the same steps, prohibiting the practice by 2026. Efforts have been made to push an EU-wide ban with standardized regulation for all countries. In 2024, the UK government's official Animal Welfare Committee recommended that the UK ban chick culling, although their recommendation is not legally binding.

In the US, male culling has received substantial attention from animal activists, although no legislation has been passed. The egg industry has indicated that they will strongly support the adoption of in-ovo sexing technology once it is available.

A number of state governments in India have mandated that in-ovo sexing be used once it becomes available.

=== Academic research ===
For a long time it was unknown how to determine the sex of an egg before hatching. The poultry sector has worked to develop an approach to sexing before hatch in order to phase out chick culling in the interest of animal welfare.

The first study on in-ovo sexing was published in 2013. The researched procedure, later called bio-marker detection, used a hormonal test for the allantoic fluid of brown layers’ eggs and was able to sex eggs by day 9 of incubation. Further research was done by Prof. Dr. Einspanier following the same methodology. This method was found to affect egg hatchability.

In 2016, the fluorescence spectroscopy methodology was developed, analyzing the extraembryonic blood to determine the sex of the embryo through its blood wavelength. The supervised egg classification by a PC with a 93% error rate was able to determine the sex of 380 eggs at 3.5 incubation day. In 2017 a variation of this methodology was developed, pattern analysis in hyperspectral images. Under this method, the eggs are first candled with halogen lamps. Next, a hyperspectral camera collects the transmitted light and the eggs are classified using a linear discriminant analysis. This methodology can perform in-ovo sexing from day 11 to day 14 with a 97% accuracy.

In 2019, a new methodology of AI-powered imaging was developed, combining AI and MRI to perform in-ovo sexing on day 12 with 95% accuracy. MRI had previously been used since 2007 for studying egg development in a contactless manner, but it wasn't suitable for large-scale in-ovo sexing until it was combined with AI.

=== Commercial rollout ===
In 2018, Seleggt became the first company to successfully introduce in-ovo sexing into commercial markets. Drawing on Dr. Einspanier's research, Seleggt managed to sex the hatching eggs on day 9 of the incubation process with a hormone test. In November 2018, the German supermarket REWE began selling eggs from hens that were sexed with the Seleggt method. Since 2018, Seleggt eggs have been available in Germany, France, and the Netherlands.

European market

Since Seleggt's launch in 2018, several other in-ovo sexing companies have entered the European market, each using different methodologies and technologies for in-ovo sexing. As of April 2025, it was estimated that 28 percent of the layer flock in Europe was hatched with in-ovo sexing from five different companies. An in-ovo sexed chick is estimated to cost around $3.80, compared to $0.95 for a conventional chick. Since a chick lays around 350 eggs over its life, this means an additional 0.8 cents per table egg sold. These eggs then sell for less than 1 cent per table egg, the difference including the additional margins from each part of the supply chain.

American market

In December 2024, the first in-ovo sexing machine was installed in the US. In June 2025, the United Egg Producers introduced an in-ovo sexing certification that verifies if consumer eggs were produced using in-ovo sexing technology. In July 2025, NestFresh became the first company to sell eggs produced with in-ovo sexing in the US under the "Humanely Hatched" label. Other egg producers like Kipster have announced their adoption of in-ovo sexing technology, although their eggs are not available on the market yet.

== Sex determination methods ==
The in-ovo sexing technologies have evolved into two main categories: optical and non-optical (Fig. 1). Non-optical technologies are any techniques that requires extracting a sample from the egg through sampling and biochemical analysis for the in-ovo sexing process. Examples of these are biomarker detection, PCR and ELISA. The main drawbacks of invasive procedures is that they may affect the eggs’ hatchability and that the process implies a risk for bacterial infection. On the other hand, optical technologies, have a contactless in-ovo sexing procedure (e.g. spectroscopy, AI-powered imaging) are free of this previous risks.

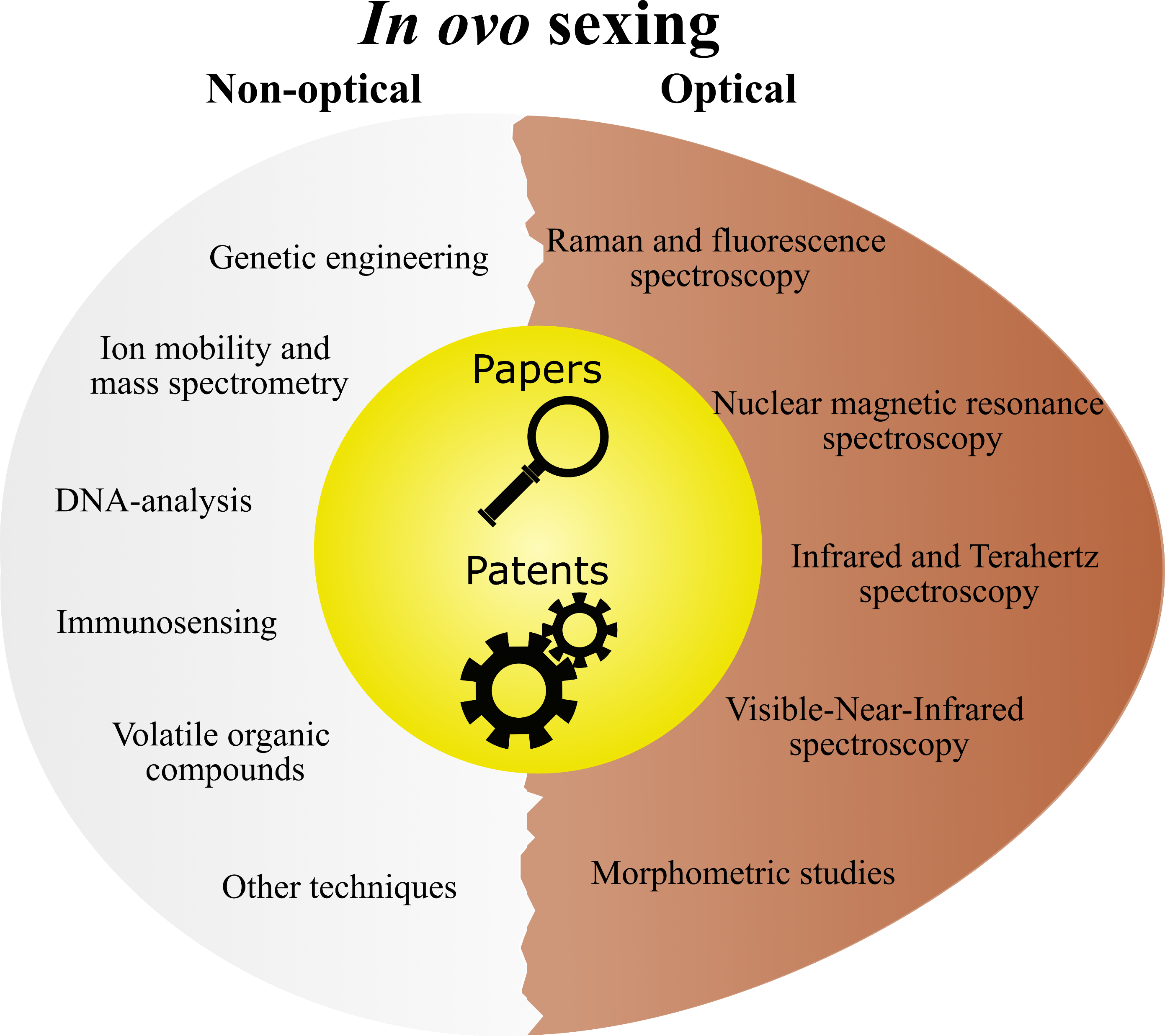
Non-optical and optical in ovo sexing technologies currently being developed. Data found in existing papers and patents. Adapted from:

=== Non-optical technologies ===
Biomarker detection (Seleggt)

The Dutch–German company Seleggt measures a substance that is a 'biomarker' for the sex through a small hole in the eggshell on day 9 after fertilisation. After extraction of the fluid from the fertilized egg, the presence of a female-specific hormone is tested using a DNA test. The test output indicates its presence: yellow a female during the absence of color a male, with a 99.5% accuracy rate. As of May 2019, Seleggt sexed one egg per second (3,600 an hour) and thus enabled 30,000 'no-kill' female chicks to hatch in Germany every week. The German Federal Ministry of Food and Agriculture (BMEL) has invested 5 million euros in the development of the Seleggt technology.

=== Non-invasive technologies ===
Spectroscopy (AAT, Project Soo, Hypereye)

Another German company, Agri Advanced Technologies (AAT), uses spectroscopy to determine the sex of the egg. The hatching egg is examined with by light beam, with a hyperspectral measuring technology the sex is determined on the basis of the calculated light spectrum. This method works for hatching eggs from sex-linked breeds where male and female birds have different color plumage, all males white-feathered and all females brown-feathered for example, and can take place from the 13th day of the hatching process. AAT's goal is to eventually be able to sex eggs at the 4th day. The German Agriculture Ministry has also invested in AAT's technological development.

The French company Tronico, based in La Roche-sur-Yon, collaborates with the French National Centre for Scientific Research (CNRS) on Projet Soo, which employs a mix of spectroscopy and the use of biosensors with the target of achieving 90% accuracy in ovo sexing at 9 days of incubation by the end of 2019. In 2017, French Agriculture Minister Stéphane Le Foll granted Projet Soo 4.3 million euros to finance its egg sexing research.

Hypereye is a Canadian spectroscopic technology that is being developed by the Egg Research Development Foundation (ERDF), initially funded by Poultry Industry Council in Ontario and later by Egg Farmers of Ontario (EFO). It aims to achieve a 99% accuracy rate and to process 30,000–50,000 eggs per hour (8.3–13.9 eggs per second). In 2018, Canadian Agriculture Minister Lawrence MacAulay announced an $844,000 investment in the research project to stimulate its development.

==== AI-powered imaging (Orbem) ====
Based on years of scientific research at the interface of AI, imaging technology and embryonic poultry development, Orbem was founded in 2019 as a spin-off from the Technical University of Munich. Orbem uses AI-powered MRI to conduct in-ovo sexing on day 11 - 12 of incubation, with a throughput of up to 24,000 eggs per hour. The solution applies equally to brown and white eggs. The solution is contactless and has no effect on the hatchability rate.

Genus Focus has different installations across Europe, including France, Germany, the Netherlands and soon Norway. Orbem has entered a strategic partnership with the Vencomatic Group (NL) for end-to-end automation of the process, which includes financing facilitated by the Vencomatic Group of up to 15 million Euros for equipment to be deployed at customer sites throughout Europe. This allows hatcheries to use the combined solution without any upfront investment just based on a performance fee per egg.

== See also ==
- Auto-sexing
