= Determination of sex =

Determining a human or other animal's biological sex

Determination of sex is the process by which the biological sex of a person or other animal is discerned, usually by medical professionals or scientists, using biological sexual traits and genetics. For most humans, sex is determined, and assigned, at birth.

== Primary sex determination ==
Primary sex determination is the determination of the gonads. In mammals, including humans, primary sex determination is strictly chromosomal and is not usually influenced by the environment. Hence, the gonads are usually indicative of the biological sex. This direct correlation allows scientists and medical professionals the option to determine biological sex using gonads. When the purpose is to distinguish male vs. female in animals, this is sexing.

Genetic sequencing is a second way for a scientist to determine biological sex in both humans and animals (distinct from sexing). It became widely available and popular at the turn of the century. Genetic sequencing also allows for the determination of rare genetic events when the y chromosome is incomplete and a male animal has female gonads.

== Prenatal determination ==
Prenatal sex determination is prenatal testing for discerning the sex of a person or other animal before birth. Techniques include:

- Cell-free fetal DNA testing, wherein a venipuncture is performed on the mother to analyze the small amount of fetal DNA that can be found within it.
- Chorionic villus sampling (CVS) and amniocentesis, which are two rather invasive testing procedures.
- Obstetric ultrasonography, either transvaginally or transabdominally, which can check for the sagittal sign as a marker of fetal sex.

== Use in medicine and science ==
The determination of sex by physicians at the time of birth is used in medicine for health care purposes.

== See also ==
- Sex assignment
- Sex differences in humans
- Sex differences in human physiology
