= Cervical dislocation =

Method of animal euthanasia

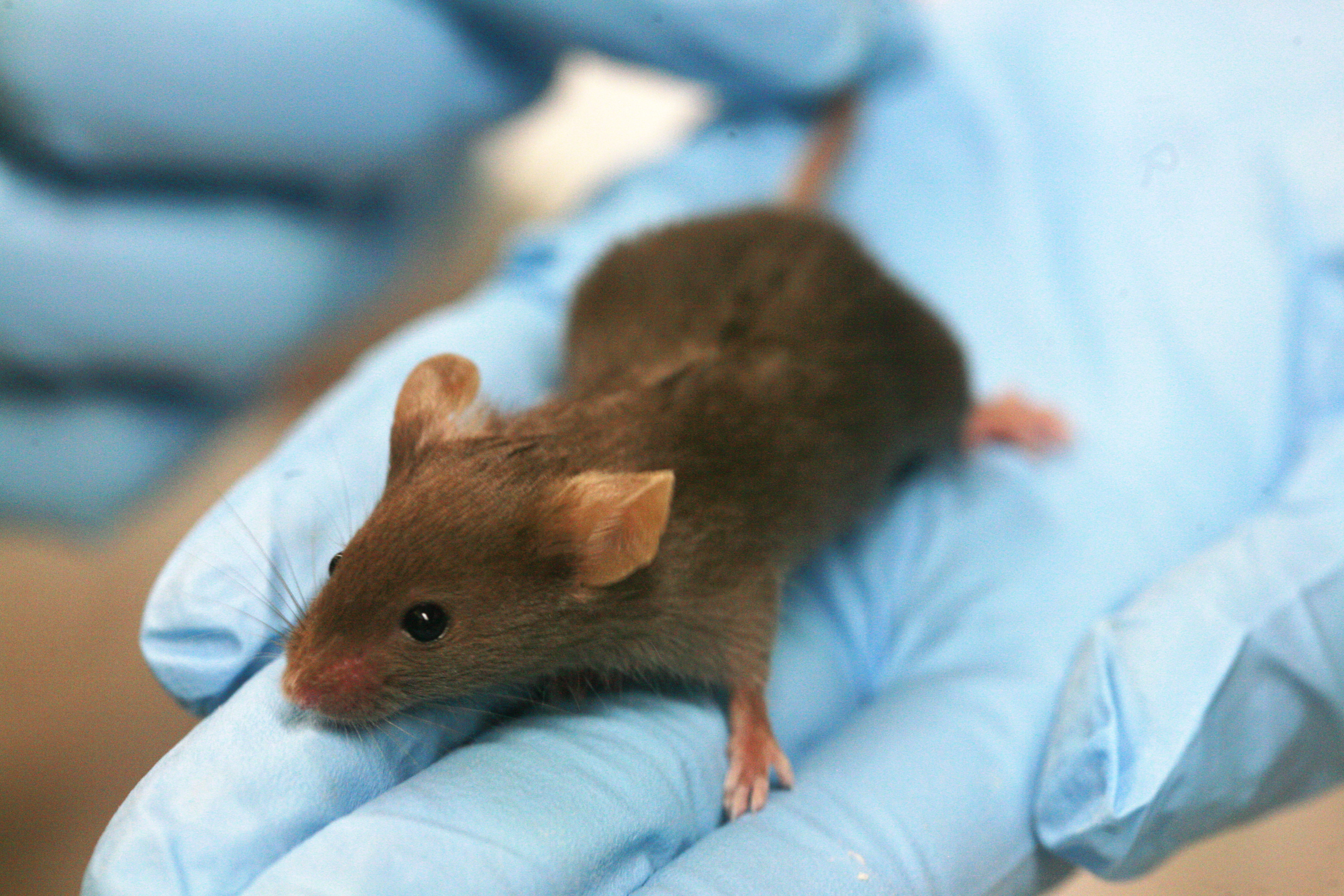
Cervical dislocation is a common method of euthanising laboratory mice.

Cervical dislocation is a common method of animal euthanasia. It refers to a technique used in physical euthanasia of small animals by applying pressure to the neck and dislocating the spinal column from the skull or brain. The aim is to quickly separate the spinal cord from the brain so as to provide the animal with a fast, painless, and easy death.

== Technique ==
Firm pressure is applied at the base of the skull, along with a sharp pinching and twisting of the thumb and forefinger. At the same time, the tail is pulled backward. This severs the spinal cord at the base of the brain or within the cervical spine area (the upper third of the neck). According to the Canadian Council on Animal Care (CCAC), cervical dislocation is normally only conducted on small animals.

== Ethics ==
The University of Iowa and some veterinary associations consider the technique to be an ethically acceptable method for killing small rodents such as rats, mice, squirrels, etc.

== See also ==
- Cervical fracture
- Blunt trauma
- Slaughter (livestock)
