= Sexing =

Identification of the sex of animals

Sexing or gender identification is the process of determining the sex of an individual animal. Through sexing, biologists and agricultural workers determine the sex of livestock and other animals they work with. The specialized trade of chick sexing has a particular importance in the poultry industry.

The sex of mammals can often be determined using sexually dimorphic characteristics. Assisted physical sexing is relevant in vertebrates with cloacae (e.g. birds, reptiles or amphibians) when there is no external sexual dimorphism. In veterinary practice, fibroscopy is used under general anaesthesia in birds such as parrots.

Molecular sexing is a set of techniques that use DNA for determining sex in wild or domestic species (population studies, farming, genetics) or humans (archaeology, forensic medicine). Markers commonly used include amelogenin, SRY and ZFX/ZFY. Various techniques have been developed using simple polymerase chain reaction product size dimorphism, presence/absence, restriction dimorphism, or even sequencing.
