= Chick sexing =

Method of distinguishing the sex of chickens and other hatchlings

1951 news item about breeding and sexing chicks in the Netherlands, with English subtitles

Chick sexing is the method of distinguishing the sex of chickens and other hatchlings, usually by a trained person called a chick sexer or chicken sexer. Chicken sexing is practiced mostly by large commercial hatcheries to separate female chicks or "pullets" (destined to lay eggs for commercial sale) from the males or "cockerels" (most of which are killed within days of hatching because they are irrelevant to egg production). The females and a limited number of males kept for meat production are then put on different feeding programs appropriate for their commercial roles.

Different segments of the poultry industry sex chickens for various reasons. In farms that produce eggs, males are unwanted; for meat production, separate male and female lines for breeding are maintained to produce the hybrid birds that are sold for the table, and chicks of the wrong sex in either line are unwanted. Chicks of an unwanted sex are killed almost immediately to reduce costs to the breeder.

== Methods of chick sexing ==
Several methods are used to determine the sex of a day-old chick. Some are effective only with certain breeds or crosses, while others are universal. The two chief methods of sexing chicks are feather sexing and vent sexing.

Small poultry farmers whose operations are not of sufficient size to warrant hiring a chicken sexer must wait until the hatching are four to six weeks old before learning the sexes of their chickens. At that time, their secondary sex characteristics begin to appear, making it possible for anyone with a minimal amount of training to sex a chicken.

=== Vent sexing ===
Vent sexing in Wenchang, Hainan, China (2014)

Vent sexing, also known simply as venting, involves squeezing the feces out of the chick, which opens up the chick's anal vent (called a cloaca) slightly, allowing the chicken sexer to see if the chick has a small "bump", which would indicate that the chick is a male. Some females also have bumps, though they are rarely as large as those of male chicks.

The eminence or genital organ is found midway on the lower rim of the vent, and looks like a very small pimple. Most males have a relatively prominent eminence; most females have none. However, a small proportion of both males and female have relatively small eminences. Sexing these chickens can be quite difficult, but with regular practice, the sexer will eventually learn to identify the differences.

When learning to sex chickens, it is best to assume that chickens with small eminences are female. The male eminence is solid and will not disappear upon gentle rubbing with one's thumb.

A paper about vent sexing was published in Japan in 1933 by Professors Masui and Hashimoto, which was soon translated into English under the title sexing baby chicks. After their discovery, interested poultry breeders hired those who had been trained in Masui and Hashimoto's technique, or sent representatives to Japan to learn it.

=== Feather sexing ===
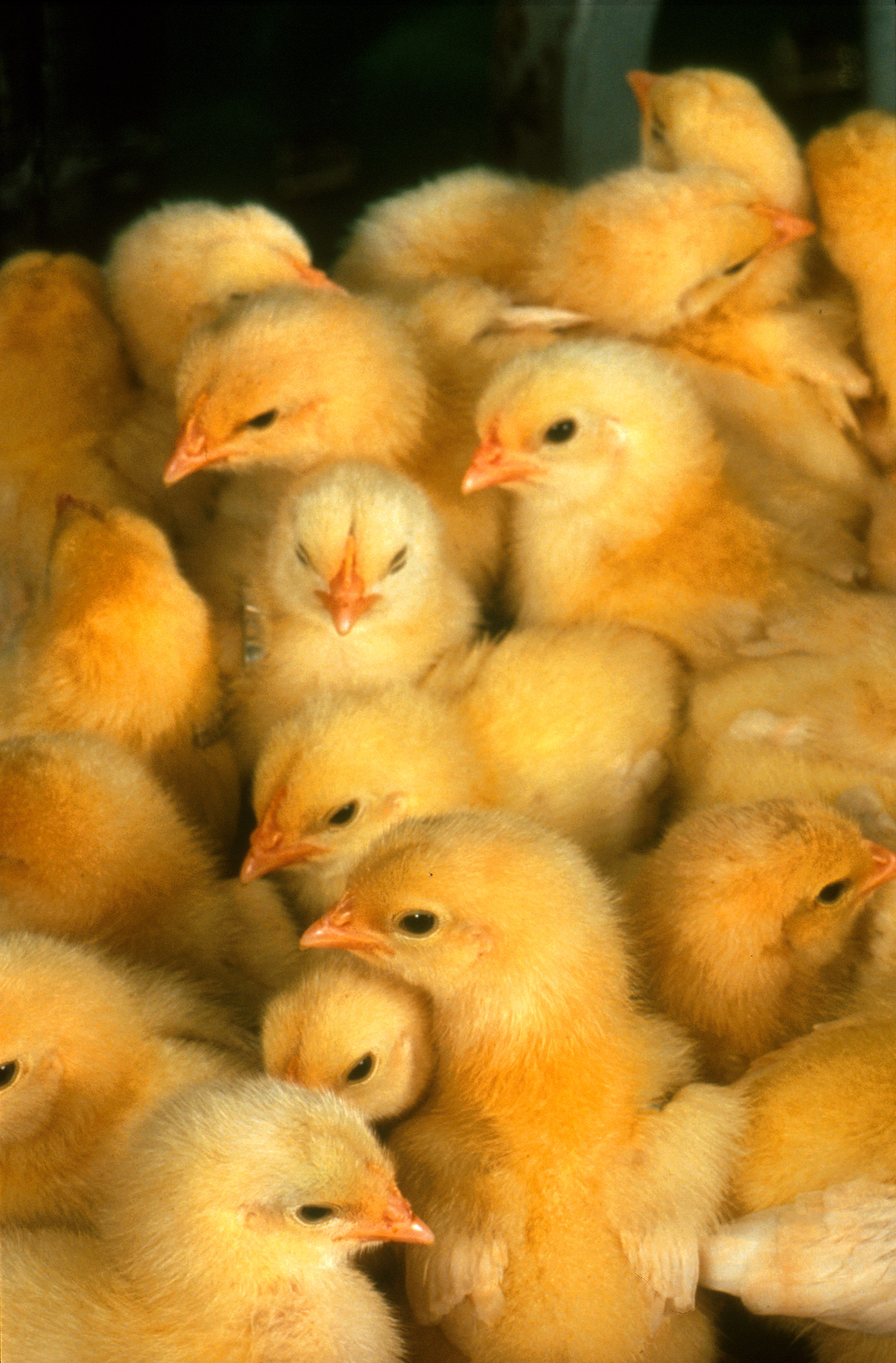
Chicks of different sexes can appear quite similar.

(See also Delayed feathering in chickens for a description of the genes involved.)

The sex-linked slow-feathering gene can be used for crosses where the sex of the chicks can be determined at hatching time by the length of the wing feathers. A cross between a fast-feathering male and a slow-feathering female results in offspring where the female chicks have primary wing feathers that are significantly longer than the coverts. The male chicks have primary wing feathers that are shorter, about the same length as the coverts.

=== Colour sexing ===
The sex-linked silver/gold (Ss) gene can also be used to sex newly hatched chicks. An S female mated to an s male produces offspring where the females have a darker, buff down color, while the males have a lighter, whiter down colour. If not obscured by other coloration (controlled by other genes), the chicks can accurately be sexed with little or no training.

=== Semi-auto-sexing breeds ===
Chicks of some breeds can be sexed with fair accuracy soon after hatching. In Barred Rock chickens, male chicks tend to have a large and distinct pale spot on the head, while hen chicks have a smaller and less defined spot. This is due to the effects of the incompletely dominant barred (B) gene. Rhode Island Red and New Hampshire Red chicks with chipmunk stripes are almost always females.

=== Auto-sexing breeds ===
The effects of the barred gene are more clearly seen in chicks with pale down. From the late 1920s, auto-sexing breeds were created at the University of Cambridge by cross-breeding Barred Rocks with a wide range of other breeds; the first of these was the Cambar, created by Reginald Punnett in 1928. In male chicks the pale head spot spreads over much of the body, which is pale; hen chicks have darker markings to the head. One example of an auto-sexing breed is the California Gray, developed by Dryden Farms in the 1950s.

=== In-ovo sexing ===
Automated systems to determine the sex of the developing chick long before hatching were first introduced in 2018. As of June 2023, five different companies had commercially available in-ovo sexing technology. Some of these technologies involve running an analysis on a sample of allantoic fluid from each egg. Other technology rely on hyperspectral or MRI-based imaging. These technologies are estimated to be used for 15 percent of the layers in Europe.

=== Machine sexing ===
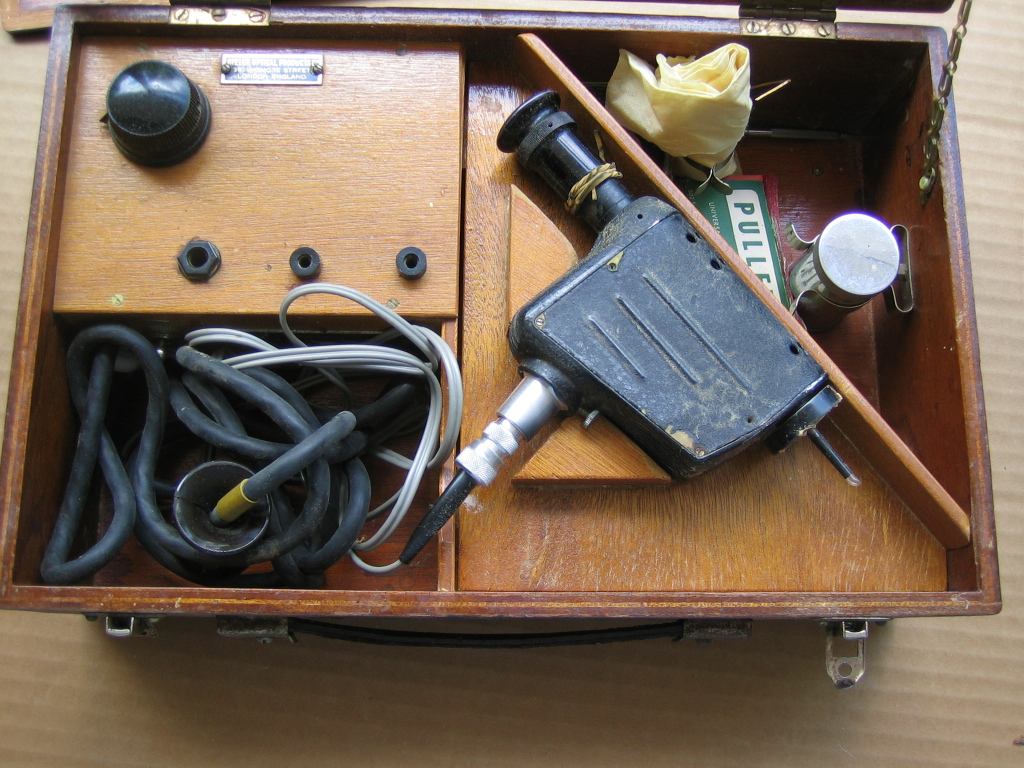
Chicken sexing machine

Instrument or machine sexing of chickens has almost disappeared, because the instruments are no longer available, and spare parts cannot be obtained. The Keeler Optical (English) or Chicktester (Japanese) machine features a blunt-ended telescopic tube, containing a light. The sexer inserts the tube into the evacuated cloaca and with the help of the light can identify either testis or ovaries.

== See also ==
- Sexing
- Chick culling
- Delayed feathering in chickens
