= Animal psychopathology =

Branch of scientific study

Animal psychopathology is the study of mental or behavioral disorders in non-human animals.

Historically, there has been an anthropocentric tendency to emphasize the study of animal psychopathologies as models for human mental illnesses. But animal psychopathologies can, from an evolutionary point of view, be more properly regarded as non-adaptive behaviors due to some sort of a cognitive disability, emotional impairment or distress. This article provides a non-exhaustive list of animal psychopathologies.

== Eating disorders ==
Animals in the wild appear to be relatively free from eating disorders, although their body composition fluctuates depending on seasonal and reproductive cycles. However, domesticated animals including farm, laboratory, and pet animals are prone to disorders. Evolutionary fitness drives feeding behavior in wild animals. The expectation is that farm animals also display this behavior, but questions arise about whether the same principles apply to laboratory and pet animals.

=== Activity anorexia ===
Activity anorexia (AA) is a condition where rats begin to exercise excessively while simultaneously cutting down on their food intake, similar to human anorexia nervosa or hypergymnasia. When given free access to food and an exercise wheel, rats normally develop a balanced routine between exercise and food intake, which turns them into fit rats. However, if food intake is restricted and wheel access is unrestricted, rats begin to exercise more and eat less, resulting in excessive weight loss and, ultimately, death. The running cycles shift so that most of the running is done in hours before feeding is scheduled. In other conditions, AA does not develop. Unrestricted food access and restricted wheel access will not cause any significant change in either feeding or exercise routine. Also, if rats are restricted both in food intake and wheel access, they will adjust accordingly. In fact, if rats are first trained to the feeding schedule and then given unrestricted access to a running wheel, they will not develop AA behavior. Results support the notion that the running interferes with adaptation to the new feeding schedule and is associated with the reward system in the brain. One theory is that running simulates foraging, a natural behavior in wild rats. Laboratory rats, therefore, run (forage) more in response to food shortages. The effect of semi-starvation on activity has also been studied in primates. Rhesus macaque males become hyperactive in response to long-term chronic food restriction.

=== Thin sow syndrome ===
Thin sow syndrome (TSS) is a behavior observed in stalled sows that is similar to AA, where some sows after early pregnancy are extremely active, eat little, and waste away, resulting very often in death. They experience emaciation, hypothermia, a depraved appetite, restlessness, and hyperactivity. The syndrome may mainly be related to social and environmental stressors. Stress in stalled sows is often perceived as the consequence of the restraint of animals that happens in intensive production units. The sows that experience the most restraining conditions are those lactating or pregnant, as they have very little room to move around because they are kept in barred gestation crates or tethered for the 16 weeks of pregnancy, which prevents natural and social behaviors. However, increased movement and freedom are also stressful for adult sows, which is usually the case after weaning. When placed into groups, they fight vigorously, with one dominant sow emerging that eats voraciously. It is also likely that two subordinate sows make up part of the group that actively avoid competitive feeding situations and are bullied by the dominant sow. Affected sows have poor appetite but often show pica, excessive water intake (polydipsia), and are anemic.

Studies on the effects of overcrowding were conducted in the 1940s by placing pregnant Norway rats in a room with plenty of water and food and observing the population growth. The population reached a number of individuals and did not grow thereafter; overcrowding produced stress and psychopathologies. Even though there was plenty of water and food, the rats stopped eating and reproducing.

Similar effects have also been observed in dense populations of beetles. When overcrowding occurs, female beetles destroy their eggs and turn cannibalistic, eating each other. Male beetles lose interest in the females, and although there is plenty of water and food, there is no population growth. Similar effects have been observed in overcrowded situations in jack rabbits and deer.

=== Pica ===
Pica is the ingestion of non-nutritive substances and has so far been poorly documented. In non-human animals in the laboratory, it has been examined through the ingestion of kaolin (a clay mineral) by rats. Rats were induced to intake kaolin by administering various emetic stimuli such as copper sulfate, apomorphine, cisplatin, and motion. Rats are unable to vomit when they ingest a substance that is harmful, thus pica in rats is analogous to vomiting in other species; it is a way for rats to relieve digestive distress. In some animals, pica seems to be an adaptive trait, but in others it seems to be a true psychopathology, like in the case of some chickens. Chickens can display a type of pica when they are feed-deprived (feeding restriction has been adopted by the egg industry to induce molting). They increase their non-nutritive pecking, such as pecking structural features of their environment, like wood or wire on fences or the feathers of other birds. It is a typical response that occurs when feeding is restricted or is completely withdrawn. Some of the non-nutritive pecking may be due to a redirection of foraging-related behavior. Another animal that has displayed a more complex pica example are cattle. Cattle eat bones when they have a phosphorus deficiency. However, in some cases, they persist in eating bones even after their phosphorus levels have stabilized and they are getting adequate doses of phosphorus in their diet. In this case, evidence supports both a physical and psychological adaptive response. Cattle that continue to eat bones after their phosphorus levels are adequate do it because of a psychological reinforcer. "The persistence of pica in the seeming absence of a physiological cause might be due to the fortuitous acquisition of a conditioned illness during the period of physiological insult."

Cats also display pica behavior in their natural environments, and there is evidence that this behavior has a psychological aspect. Some breeds (such as the Siamese cat) are more predisposed to showing this type of behavior than other breeds, but several types of breeds have been documented to show pica. Cats have been observed to start by chewing and sucking on non-nutritive substances like wool, cotton, rubber, plastic, and even cardboard, and then progress to ingestion of these substances. This type of behavior occurs through the first four years of a cat's life, but it is primarily observed during the first two months of life, when cats are introduced into new homes. Theories explaining why this behavior becomes active during this time suggest that early weaning and stress as a consequence of separation from the mother and litter-mates and exposure to a new environment are to blame. Eating wool or other substances may be a soothing mechanism that cats develop to cope with the changes. Pica is also observed predominantly during a cat's 6–8 months of life, when territorial and sexual behaviors emerge. Pica may be induced by these social stressors. Other theories contemplated include pica as a redirection of prey-catching/ingestion behavior as a result of indoor confinement, especially common among oriental breeds due to risk of theft. In natural environments pica has been observed in parrots (such as macaws) and other birds and mammals. Charles Munn has been studying Amazon macaws licking clay from riverbeds in the Amazon to detoxify the seeds they eat. Amazon macaws spend two to three hours a day licking clay. Munn has found that clay helps counter the tannins and alkaloids in the seeds the macaws ingest, a strategy that is also used by native cultures in the Andes Mountains in Peru.

Pica also affects domesticated animals. While drugs like Prozac are often able to diminish troublesome behaviors in pet dogs, they don't seem to help with this eating disorder. The following story about Bumbley, a Wire Fox Terrier who appeared on the TV show 20/20 as a result of his eating disorder, is taken from a book by Dr. Nicholas Dodman:

This dog's presenting problem was light chasing (otherwise known as shadow chasing). It chased shadows for hours on end, even excavating through plasterboard walls to pursue its will-o'-the-wisp illusions ... The one thing that didn't come across clearly in the show was that Bumbley ate everything in sight and the house had to be "Bumbley-proofed" against his relentless ingestion of anything his owners left around ... He had already had surgery to relieve intestinal obstructions resulting from his habit and, each day, his owners reentered their house with trepidation after work, fearing that Bumbley might have eaten something else.

Dodman talks about new research relating bulimia and compulsive overeating to seizural behavior in human patients. He suggests that anti-epileptic medication might be a possible treatment for some cases of pica in animals.

== Behavioral disorders ==
Behavioral disorders are difficult to study in animal models because it is difficult to know what animals are thinking and because animal models used to assess psychopathologies are experimental preparations developed to study a condition. Lacking the ability to use language to study behavioral disorders like depression and stress questions the validity of those studies conducted. It can be difficult to attribute human conditions to non-human animals.

=== Obsessive–compulsive disorder (OCD) ===
Obsessive–compulsive behavior in animals, often called "stereotypy" or "stereotypical behavior" can be defined as a specific, unnecessary action (or series of actions) repeated more often than would normally be expected. It is unknown whether animals are able to 'obsess' in the same way as humans, and because the motivation for compulsive acts in non-human animals is unknown, the term "abnormal repetitive behavior" is less misleading.

A wide variety of animals exhibit behaviors that can be considered abnormally repetitive.

==== Ritualized and stereotyped behaviors ====
Though obsessive–compulsive behaviors are often considered to be pathological or maladaptive, some ritualized and stereotyped behaviors are beneficial. These are usually known as "fixed action patterns". These behaviors sometimes share characteristics with obsessive–compulsive behavior, including a high degree of similarity in form and use among many individuals and a repetitive dimension.

There are many observable animal behaviors with characteristic, highly conserved patterns. One example is grooming behavior in rats. This behavior is defined by a specific sequence of actions that does not normally differ between individual rats. The rat first begins by stroking its whiskers, then expands the stroking motion to include the eyes and the ears, finally moving on to lick both sides of its body. Other behaviors may be added to the end of this chain, but these four actions themselves are fixed. Its ubiquity and high degree of stereotypy suggest that this is a beneficial behavior pattern which has been maintained throughout evolutionary history.

Although humans and animals both have pathological stereotyped behaviors, they do not necessarily provide a similar model of OCD. Feather picking in orange-winged amazon parrots has both a genetic component, with the behavior being more likely in one sibling if the other does it, and more common in parrots close to a door when they were housed in groups. The same study found that feather picking was more common in females and that there was no social transmission of the behavior; neighbors of feather picking birds were only more likely to show the behavior as well if they were related.

==== An evolutionary basis ====
Some researchers believe that disadvantageous obsessive compulsive behaviors can be thought of as a normally beneficial process gone too far. Brüne (2006) suggests that change of various origin in striatal and frontal brain circuits, which play a role in predicting needs and threats that may arise in the future, may result in a hyperactive cognitive harm avoidance system, in which a person becomes consciously and unreasonably fearful of an unlikely or impossible event. This may also be true in other animals.

==== Genetic factors ====
Canine compulsions are more common in some breeds and behavioral dispositions are often shared within the same litter. This suggests that there is a genetic factor to the disorder. A questionnaire to dog owners and a blood sample of 181 dogs from four breeds, miniature and standard Bull Terriers, German Shepherds, and Staffordshire Bull Terriers showed these to be more susceptible to compulsive and repetitive behaviors. Advances in the study of canine compulsive disorder pathology could lead to advances in the understanding of the genetic and hereditary factors leading to human obsessive disorders. A chromosome has been located in dogs that confers a high risk of susceptibility to OCD. Canine chromosome 7 has been found to be most significantly associated with obsessive compulsive disorder in dogs, or more specifically, canine compulsive disorder (CCD). This breakthrough helped further relate OCD in humans to CCD in canines. Canine chromosome 7 is expressed in the hippocampus of the brain, the same area that Obsessive Compulsive Disorder is expressed in human patients. Similar pathways are involved in drug treatment responses for both humans and dogs, offering more research that the two creatures exhibit symptoms and respond to treatment in similar ways. This data can help scientists to discover more effective and efficient ways to treat OCD in humans through the information they find by studying CCD in dogs.

==== Animal models ====
Animals exhibiting obsessive and compulsive behaviors that resemble OCD in humans have been used as a tool for elucidating possible genetic influences on the disease, potential treatments, and to better understand the pathology of this behavior in general. While such models are useful, they are also limited; it is unclear whether the behavior is ego dystonic in animals. That is, it is difficult to evaluate whether an animal is aware that its behavior is excessive and unreasonable and whether this awareness is a source of anxiety.

One study done by Simon Vermeier used neuroimaging to investigate serotonergic and dopaminergic neurotransmission in 9 dogs with Canine Compulsive Disorder (CCD) to measure the serotonin 2A receptor availability. When compared to the 15 non-compulsive dogs used as a control group, the dogs with CCD were found to have lower receptor availability as well as lower subcortical perfusion and hypothalamic availability. The results of this study provide evidence that there are imbalanced serotonergic and dopaminergic pathways in dogs. Similarities between other studies about human OCD provide construct validity for this study, which suggests that the research will be valid and useful in continuing to investigate brain activity and drug treatment in Obsessive Compulsive Disorder.

Some treatment has been given to dogs with CCD to observe their reactions and how they are similar or different from how humans would react to the same pharmaceutical or behavioral treatment. A combination of the two approaches has been found to be most effective in lowering the intensity and regularity of OCD in both canines and humans. Pharmaceutically, clomipramine was found to be more effective than an alternative chemical, amitriptyline, in treatments for dogs. One study by Karen Overall discovered that by combining behavioral therapy with the more effective clomipramine, the symptoms of Canine Compulsive Disorder decreased by over 50% for all of the dogs involved in the study. The treatment outcomes mirror the prognosis for human compulsive disorders in achieving substantial improvement but maintaining a moderate degree of residual symptoms.

Alicia Graef's article makes several bold claims that dogs are the future in understanding how to better diagnose, recognize, and treat Obsessive Compulsive Disorder in humans. There is evidence supporting her statements, but the connection between CCD and OCD is not clearly understood. So far, studies have proved that effective treatments in dogs are similarly effective for humans, but there are still so many things unknown. Obsessive Compulsive Disorder is a unique mental disorder that cannot be fully cured. It can be controlled and understood, and one possible way of better doing that might be through studying CCD in canines. Studying dogs that exhibit compulsive behaviors has led scientists to genetic breakthroughs in understanding more how biology and genetics factor into Obsessive Compulsive Disorder. By observing and studying how CCD manifests in the brain activity, behaviors, and genes of diagnosed canines, scientists have been able to use their newfound information to develop better diagnostic tests and more readily recognize symptoms and susceptible humans. The similar brain functions and behaviors of dogs with CCD and humans with OCD suggests they have a connection, not only in behavior and symptoms, but in reacting to treatments. Understanding Canine Compulsive Disorder in dogs has helped scientists to better understand and apply their learning to developing new and more effective ways to treat Obsessive Compulsive Disorder in humans.

Some examples of ways in which rats and mice, two of the most common animal models, have been used to represent human OCD are provided below.

Lever pressing in rats

Certain laboratory rat strains that have been created by controlled breeding for many generations show a higher tendency towards compulsive behaviors than other strains. Lewis rats show more compulsive lever pressing behavior than Sprague Dawley or Wistar rats and are less responsive to the anti-compulsive drug paroxetine. In this study, rats were taught to press a lever to receive food in an operant conditioning task. Once food was no longer provided when they pressed the lever, rats were expected to stop pressing it. Lewis rats pressed the lever more often than the other two types, even though they had presumably learned that they would not receive food, and continued to press it more often even after treatment with the drug. An analysis of the genetic differences between the three rat strains might help to identify genes that might be responsible for the compulsive behavior.

Rats have also been used to test the possibility of a problem with dopamine levels in the brains of animals that exhibit compulsive checking behavior. After treating rats with quinpirole, a chemical that specifically blocks dopamine D2/D3 receptors, compulsive checking of certain locations in an open field increased. Some components of the checking behavior, such as the level of stereotypy in the path animals took to checked locations, the number of checks, and the length of the checks indicated an increase in compulsivity as doses of quinpirole increased; other components, such as the time taken to return from the checked location to the starting point and the time taken to make that trip remained constant after the initial injection throughout the experiment. This means that there might be both an all-or-none and a sensitization aspect in the biology of the dopamine deficiency model of OCD. In addition, quinpirole might reduce a sense of satisfaction in the rats after they check a location, causing them to return to that location again and again.

Estrogen deficiency in male mice

Based on findings of changes in OCD symptoms in menstruating women and differences in the development of the disease between men and women, Hill and colleagues set out to research the effect of estrogen deprivation on the development of compulsive behavior in mice. Male mice with an aromatase gene knockout who were unable to produce estrogen showed excessive grooming and wheel running behaviors, but female mice did not. When treated with 17β-estradiol, which replaced estrogen in these mice, the behaviors disappeared. This study also found that COMT protein levels decreased in mice that did not produce estrogen and increased in the hypothalamus after estrogen-replacement treatment. Briefly, the COMT protein is involved in degrading some neurotransmitters, including dopamine, norepinephrine and epinephrine. This data suggests that there may be a hormonal component and a hormone-gene interaction effect that may contribute to obsessive behaviors.

Pets

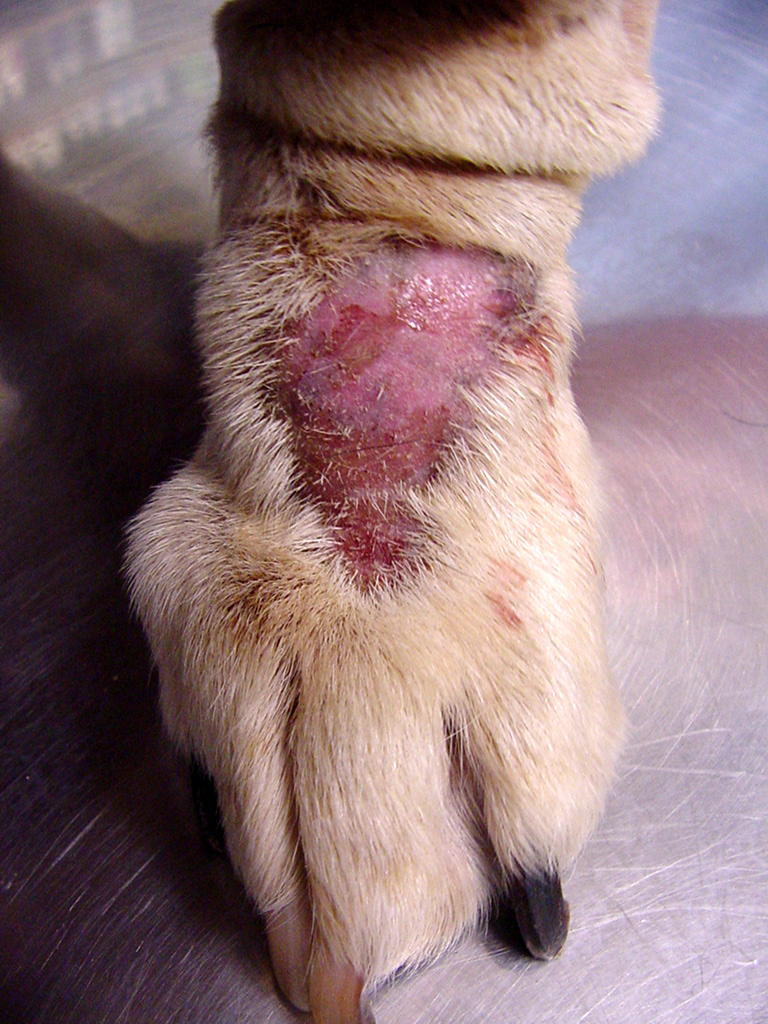
Lick granuloma from excessive licking

Dr. Nicholas Dodman describes a wide variety of OCD-like behaviors in his book Dogs Behaving Badly. Such behaviors typically appear when the dog is placed in a stressful situation, including an environment that is not very stimulating, or in dogs with a history of abuse. Different breeds of dog seem to display different compulsions. Lick granuloma, or licking repeatedly until ulcers form on the skin, affects more large dogs, like Labradors, Golden Retrievers, Great Danes, and Dobermans, while Bull Terriers, German Shepherds, Old English Sheepdogs, Rottweilers, and wire-haired Fox Terriers, and English Springer Spaniels are more likely to snap at imaginary flies or chase light and shadows. These associations probably have an evolutionary basis, although Dodman does not clearly explain that aspect of the behaviors.

Louis Shuster and Nicholas Dodman noticed that dogs often demonstrate obsessive and compulsive behaviors similar to humans. Canine Compulsive Disorder (CCD) is not only specific to certain breeds of dogs, but the breed may affect the specific types of compulsions. For example, bull terriers frequently exhibit obsessively predatory or aggressive behaviors. Breed may factor into the types of compulsions, but some behaviors are more common across the canine spectrum. Most commonly, CCD is seen in canines as they repeat behaviors such as chasing their tails, compulsively chewing on objects, or licking their paws excessively, similar to the common hand-washing compulsion many people with Obsessive Compulsive Disorder have. Hallucinating and attacking the air around their head, as if there were a bug there, is another compulsion that has been seen in some dogs. Circling, hair biting, staring, and sometimes even barking are other examples of behaviors that are considered compulsions in dogs when taken to extreme, repetitive actions.

==== Treatment (pharmaceutical) ====
Dodman advocates the use of exercise, an enriched environment (like providing noises for dogs to listen to while owners are at work), and often Prozac (an SSRI used to treat OCD in humans) as treatments.

Shuster and Dodman tested pharmaceutical treatment on canines with CCD to see if it would work as effectively as it does in humans. They used glutamate receptor blockers (memantine) and fluoxetine, commonly known as the antidepressant Prozac, to treat and observe the reactions of 11 dogs with compulsions. Seven of the 11 dogs significantly reduced their compulsions in intensity and frequency after receiving medication.

Dodman includes a story about Hogan, a castrated deaf male Dalmatian, and his compulsive behavior. Hogan had a history of neglect and abuse before he was adopted by Connie and Jim, who attempted to improve his behavior by teaching him to respond to American Sign Language. The following are some excerpts from Hogan's file:

All was well for a year and a half when suddenly, one March morning, he woke up and started pawing everything in sight, and just wouldn't stop. He pawed rugs and blankets, hardwood floors and linoleum, grass and dirt surfaces ... The similarity between what he was doing and prey-seeking behavior was remarkable.

I do believe ... that Hogan was under some kind of psychological pressure at the time the compulsive pawing behavior developed. ... Connie and Jim were compelled to leave him for some eight hours a day while they went to work. ... The pendulum was set and ready to swing. The actual compulsion that develops under such circumstances is less relevant than the fact that one "does" develop.

The "three R's" of rehabilitation are exercise, nutrition, and communication. First, I advised Connie to step up Hogan's exercise to a minimum of thirty minutes of aerobic activity a day. In addition, I advised that Hogan should be fed a low-protein, preservative-free diet. Completing the rehabilitation checklist, I exhorted Connie to work even harder with the sign-language and instructed her on a new sign to use when Hogan started digging. The sign was a piece of card with the letter "H" written on it in thick black pen. Connie was to show Hogan this sign as soon as possible after he engaged in a bout of unwanted pawing and then leave the room. The idea was to let him know that the behavior was not wanted by signaling to him that Connie was about to leave the room. ... Call me a coward, but I didn't think that alone would cut it because of previous experiences with canine compulsive disorders so, employing a belt-and-suspenders strategy, I also advised medicating Hogan with the tricyclic antidepressant Elavil. Theoretically, Elavil wouldn't be that good in obsessive-compulsive behavior but, limited for reasons of expense, and bearing in mind the possible contribution of separation anxiety, Elavil was my best shot.

It took six months before Hogan was over the hump of treatment success. ... At this time Hogan only engaged in occasional pawing of significantly reduced intensity, and the pawing only occurred in moments of stress. Connie reported that stresses particularly likely to induce pawing included being unable to find her and sensing that he was about to be left alone. ... Hogan continued to improve and reached a point at which he was almost pawing-free - but not quite. That seems to be the way with compulsive disorders in man and beast. They can be reduced to the level of permitting affectees to lead relatively normal lives, but there are occasional relapses.

=== Addiction ===
Sugar addiction has been examined in laboratory rats and it develops in the same way that drug addiction develops. Eating sugary foods causes the brain to release natural chemicals called opioids and dopamine in the limbic system. Tasty food can activate opioid receptors in the ventral tegmental area and thereby stimulate cells that release dopamine in the nucleus accumbens (NAc). The brain recognizes the intense pleasure derived from the dopamine and opioids release and learns to crave more sugar. Dependence is created through these natural rewards, the sugary treats, and the opioid and dopamine released into the synapses of the mesolimbic system. The hippocampus, the insula and the caudate activate when rats crave sugar, which are the same areas that become active when drug addicts crave the drug. Sugar is good because it provides energy, but if the nervous system goes through a change and the body becomes dependent on the sugar intake, somatic signs of withdrawal begin to appear like chattering teeth, forepaw tremors and head shakes when sugar is not ingested. Morphine tolerance, a measure of addiction, was observed in rats and their tolerance on Morphine was attributed to environmental cues and the systemic effects of the drug. Morphine tolerance does not depend merely on the frequency of pharmacological stimulation, but rather on both the number of pairings of a drug-predictive cue with the systemic effects of the drug. Rats became significantly more tolerant to morphine when they had been exposed to a paired administration than those rats that were not administered a drug-predictive cue along with the morphine.

=== Depression ===
Using dogs, Martin Seligman and his colleagues pioneered the study of depression in the animal model of learned helplessness at the University of Pennsylvania. Dogs were separated into three groups, the control group, group A, and group B. Group A had control over when they were being shocked, while group B had no control over when they were being shocked. After the shocking condition, the dogs were tested in a shuttle box where they could escape electrocution by jumping over a partition. To eliminate an interference effect – the dogs did not learn new responses to being shocked that would interfere with their normal escape behavior. The dogs were immobilized using curare, a paralyzing drug while they were being shocked. Both the control group and group A tended to jump over the partition to escape shock while group B dogs did not jump and would passively take the shock. The dogs in group B perceived that the outcome was not related to their efforts. Consequently, a theory emerged that attributed the behavior of the animals to the effects of the shock as a stressor so extreme that it depleted a neurochemical needed by the animals for movement. After the study on dogs, the effects of helplessness have been tested in species from fish to cats. Most recently learned helplessness have been studied in rhesus macaques using inescapable shock, evoked through stress situations like forced swimming, behavioral despair tasks, tails suspension and pinch induced catalepsy; situations that render the monkey incapable of controlling the environment.

Depression and low mood were found to be of a communicative nature. They signal yielding in a hierarchy conflict or a need for help. Low mood to extreme low mood (also known as depression) can regulate a pattern of engagement and foster disengagement from unattainable goals. "Low mood increases an organism's ability to cope with the adaptive challenges characteristic of unpropitious situations in which effort to pursue a major goal will likely result in danger, loss, bodily damage, or wasted effort." Being apathetic can have a fitness advantage for the organism. Depression has also been studied as a behavioral strategy used by vertebrates to increase their personal or inclusive fitness in the threat of parasites and pathogens.

The lack of neurogenesis has been linked to depression. Animals with stress (isolated, cortisol levels) show a decrease in neurogenesis and antidepressants have been discovered to promote neurogenesis. Rene Hen and his colleagues at Columbia University ran a study on rats in which they blocked neurogenesis by applying radiation to the hippocampal area to test the efficacy of antidepressants. Results suggested that antidepressants failed to work when neurogenesis was inhibited.

=== Stress ===
Robert Sapolsky has extensively studied baboons in their natural environment in the Serengeti in Africa. He noticed that baboons have very similar hierarchies in their society as do humans. They spend very few hours searching for food and fulfilling their primary needs, leaving them with time to develop their social network. In primates, mental stresses show up in the body. Primates experience psychological stresses that can elicit physiological responses that, over time, can make them sick. Sapolsky observed the baboons' ranks, personalities and social affiliations, then collected blood samples of the baboons to control the cortisol (stress hormone) levels of the baboons, then matched social position to cortisol levels. Most of the data have been collected from male baboons, because at any given time 80 percent of the females were pregnant. Three factors influenced a baboon's cortisol levels: friendships, perspective, and rank. Baboons had lower levels of cortisol if they 1. played with infants and cultivated friendships, 2. could tell if a situation was a real threat and could tell if they were going to win or lose, and 3. were top ranking.

Cortisol levels rise with age and hippocampal cells express fewer hormone receptors on their surface to protect themselves from excess, making it harder to control stress levels. Cortisol levels are elevated in half of people with major depression, it is the hippocampal region that is affected by both. Stress can have negative effects on gastrointestinal function causing ulcers, and it can also decrease sex drive, affect sleeping patterns and elevate blood pressure but it can also stimulate and motivate. When animals experience stress, they are generally more alert than when they are not stressed. It may help them be better aware of unfamiliar environments and possible threats to their life in these environments. Yerkes and Dodson developed a law that explains the empirical relationship between arousal and performance illustrated by an inverted U-shape graph. According to the Yerkes-Dodson Law, performance increases, as does cognitive arousal, but only to a certain point. The downward part of the U-shape is caused by stress and as stress increases so does efficiency and performance, but only to a certain point. When stress becomes too great, performance and efficiency decline.

Sapolsky has also studied stress in rats and his results indicate that early experiences in young rats have strong, lasting effects. Rats that were exposed to human handling (a stressful situation) had finely-tuned stress responses that may have lowered their lifetime exposure to stress hormones compared to those that were not handled. In short: stress can be adaptive. The more exposure to stressful situations, the better the rat can handle that situation.

=== Stereotypies ===
Stereotypies are repetitive, sometimes abnormal behaviors like pacing on the perch for birds. There are adaptive stereotypic behaviors such as grooming in cats and preening in birds. Captive parrots commonly perform a range of stereotypies. These behaviors are repeated identically and lack any function or goal. Captive parrots perform striking oral and locomotor stereotypies like pacing on the perch or repetitive play with a certain toy. Feather picking and loud vocalizations can be stereotypies but are not as rigid and may be reactions to confinement, stress, boredom and loneliness as studies have shown that parrots that are in cages closest to the door are the most prone to feather pick or scream. Feather picking is not a true stereotypy and is more like hair pulling in humans. Loud vocalizations or screaming can be a stereotypy but vocalization is part of a parrot's natural behavior. Captive parrots lack sufficient stimulation. Presumably they suffer from lack of companionship and opportunities to forage. Stereotypies can evolve from the social environment for example the presence or absence of certain social stimuli, social isolation, low feeder space and high stocking density (especially for tail biting in pigs). These behaviors can also be transmitted through social learning. Bank voles, pigeons and pigs when housed next to animals that show stereotypies, pick them up as well as through stimulus enhancement which is what happens in tail biting in pigs and feather pecking by hens.

Stereotypies may be coping mechanisms as results suggest from study on tethered and stalled sows. Sows that are tethered and stalled exhibited more stereotypies like licking and rubbing than sows that are in groups outdoors. This abnormal behavior seems to be related to opioid (related to the reward system) receptor density. In sows, prolonged confinement, being tethered or being in gestation crates, results in abnormal behaviors and stereotypies. Mu and kappa receptors are associated with aversion behaviors and mu receptor density is greater in tethered sows than sows that are in groups outdoors. However, sows with stereotypy behaviors experienced a decrease both in Mu and Kappa receptor density in the brain suggesting that inactivity increases Mu receptor density and stereotypy development decrease both kappa and Mu receptor density. It is suggested that captive environment design can help prevent the existence of stereotypies, by creating an enclosure as similar as possible to the animal's natural environment and providing enrichments to stimulate their natural behavior.

=== Self-aggression ===
Rhesus macaques have been observed to display self-aggression (SA) including self-biting, self-clasping, self-slapping, self-rubbing and threatening of body parts. The rhesus macaques observed were individually caged and free of disease. Their self-aggression level rose in stressful and stimulating conditions such as moving from one cage to another. Stump-tailed macaques were studied to examine the source of their SA. SA increased in an impoverished environment and results support that SA may increase sensory input in poor environments. Captive macaques do not socialize the way wild macaques do which may affect SA. When allowed to socialize by putting another macaque in the cage or not putting them in a cage, SA levels in macaques decrease. Results indicate that SA is a form of redirected social aggression. SA is related to frustration and social status, especially in macaques that have an intermediate dominance rank.

=== Zoochosis ===
Zoochosis is a term for stereotypical, repetitive behavior observed specifically in captive animals. Some examples of these repetitive behaviors include pacing, excessive licking, self-biting, and hair/feather plucking. Captivity can induce psychological distress in animals, including anxiety, depression, and symptoms similar to OCD. This is due to prolonged exposure to stress, such as large crowds of zoo visitors and unpredictable routines, bare environments, and lack of stimulation. Another key factor is that captive animals are often unable to perform natural, goal-oriented behaviors such as finding a mate, foraging for food, or avoiding predators. Some ways that have been observed to help combat the effects of zoochosis are ensuring that enclosures are kept clean, increasing enclosure size, and providing more natural enrichment.

== See also ==
- Anthrozoology
- List of abnormal behaviors in animals
