= List of abnormal behaviours in animals =

Abnormal behaviour in animals can be defined in several ways. Statistically, abnormal is when the occurrence, frequency or intensity of a behaviour varies statistically significantly, either more or less, from the normal value. This means that theoretically, almost any behaviour could become abnormal in an individual. Less formally, 'abnormal' includes any activity judged to be outside the normal behaviour pattern for animals of that particular class or age. For example, infanticide may be a normal behaviour and regularly observed in one species, however, in another species it might be normal but becomes 'abnormal' if it reaches a high frequency, or in another species it is rarely observed, and any incidence is considered 'abnormal'. This list does not include one-time behaviours performed by individual animals that might be considered abnormal for that individual, unless these are performed repeatedly by other individuals in the species and are recognised as part of the ethogram of that species.

Most abnormal behaviours can be categorised collectively (e.g., eliminative, ingestive, stereotypies), however, many abnormal behaviours fall debatedly into several of these categories and categorisation is therefore not attempted in this list. Some abnormal behaviours may be related to environmental conditions (e.g. captive housing) whereas others may be due to medical conditions. The list does not include behaviours in animals that are genetically modified to express abnormal behaviour (e.g. reeler mice).

A polar bear performing stereotyped pacing.

An Asiatic elephant performing stereotyped rocking and trunk swinging.

== List ==
- Abnormal sexual behaviour; various types.
- Activity anorexia; a condition where animals exercise excessively while simultaneously reducing their food intake.
- Adjunctive behaviour; an activity reliably accompanying another response that has been produced by a stimulus, especially when the stimulus is presented according to a temporally defined schedule.
  A dog chasing its tail
- Barbering, or fur and whisker trimming; removing the whiskers or fur of another animal.
- Cannibalism; eating the flesh or internal organs of another animal of the same species.
- Chronic egg laying; laying an abnormal number of infertile eggs, or clutches of eggs in the absence of a mate, to the detriment of a bird's health. Particularly common in pet parrots.
- Coprophagia; eating faeces.
- Cribbing or crib-biting; grabbing a solid object such as a fence with the incisors, arching the neck, pulling against the object, and sucking in air.
- Depression; behaviours associated with a state of low mood and aversion to activity.
- Excessive vocalisation; vocalising more frequently than expected.
- Excessive aggression; aggressive acts that are more frequent or of greater intensity than expected.
- Excessive/submissive urination (polyuria); urinating more frequently than expected or under conditions where it would not be expected
- Excessive licking; excessive licking of the floor, wall or other environmental features.
- Fainting; a transient loss of consciousness and postural tone, characterized by rapid onset, short duration, and spontaneous recovery.
- Feather pecking; one bird repeatedly pecking or pulling at the feathers of another.
- Feather-plucking (pterotillomania); birds chewing, biting or plucking their own feathers with their beak, resulting in damage to the feathers and occasionally the skin.
- Forced moulting; commercial egg-laying hens losing their feathers due to the deliberate removal of food and water for several days.
- Geophagia; eating soil or sand.
- Herbivory in carnivorous animals; eating plant material by an animal that is considered to usually be meat-eating.
- Infanticide; killing of young offspring by a mature animal of its own species.
- Learned helplessness; failing to respond even though there are opportunities for the animal to help itself by avoiding unpleasant circumstances or by gaining positive rewards.
- Lignophagia; eating wood.
- Obsessive–compulsive disorder; a specific, unnecessary action or series of actions that is repeated more often than would normally be expected.
- Osteophagy; chewing or eating bones.
- Pica; eating materials other than normal food.
- Polydipsia; excessive drinking.
- Savaging; overt aggression directed to newborn offspring by a mother animal, often including cannibalistic infanticide.
- Self-cannibalism (autophagy, autosarcophagy); an animal eating itself.
- Self-injury; an animal injuring its own body tissues.
- Sham or "vacuum" dustbathing; dustbathing in the absence of appropriate substrate.
- Stable vices; stereotypies of equines, especially horses.
- Stereotypy (non-human); repeated, relatively invariant behaviours with no apparent purpose (multiple types).
- Stress/anxiety; behaviours associated with being exposed to a stressor (e.g. loss of appetite, social withdrawal).
- Stone chewing; chewing stones or rocks without swallowing them.
- Tail biting; biting or chewing the tail of another animal.
- Tail chasing; an animal chasing its own tail in circles.
- Toe pecking; one bird pecking the toes of another.
- Trichotillomania; an animal pulling out its own fur, hair or wool, often followed by eating it.
- Urine drinking; drinking urine.
- Vacuum activity; innate, fixed action patterns of behaviour performed in the absence of the external stimuli that normally elicit them.
- Vent pecking; injurious pecking directed to the cloaca, the surrounding skin and underlying tissue.
- Weaving; repeatedly rocking backwards and forwards, or from side to side.
- Zoopharmacognosy; use of substances for medicinal effect (rather than Recreational drug use in animals or for food)
- Wind sucking; similar to cribbing, whereby the horse arches its neck and sucks air into the windpipe, but without needing to grab a solid object.

== See also ==
- Stereotypy (non-human), abnormal behaviour
