= Cribbing (horse) =

Stable vice in horses

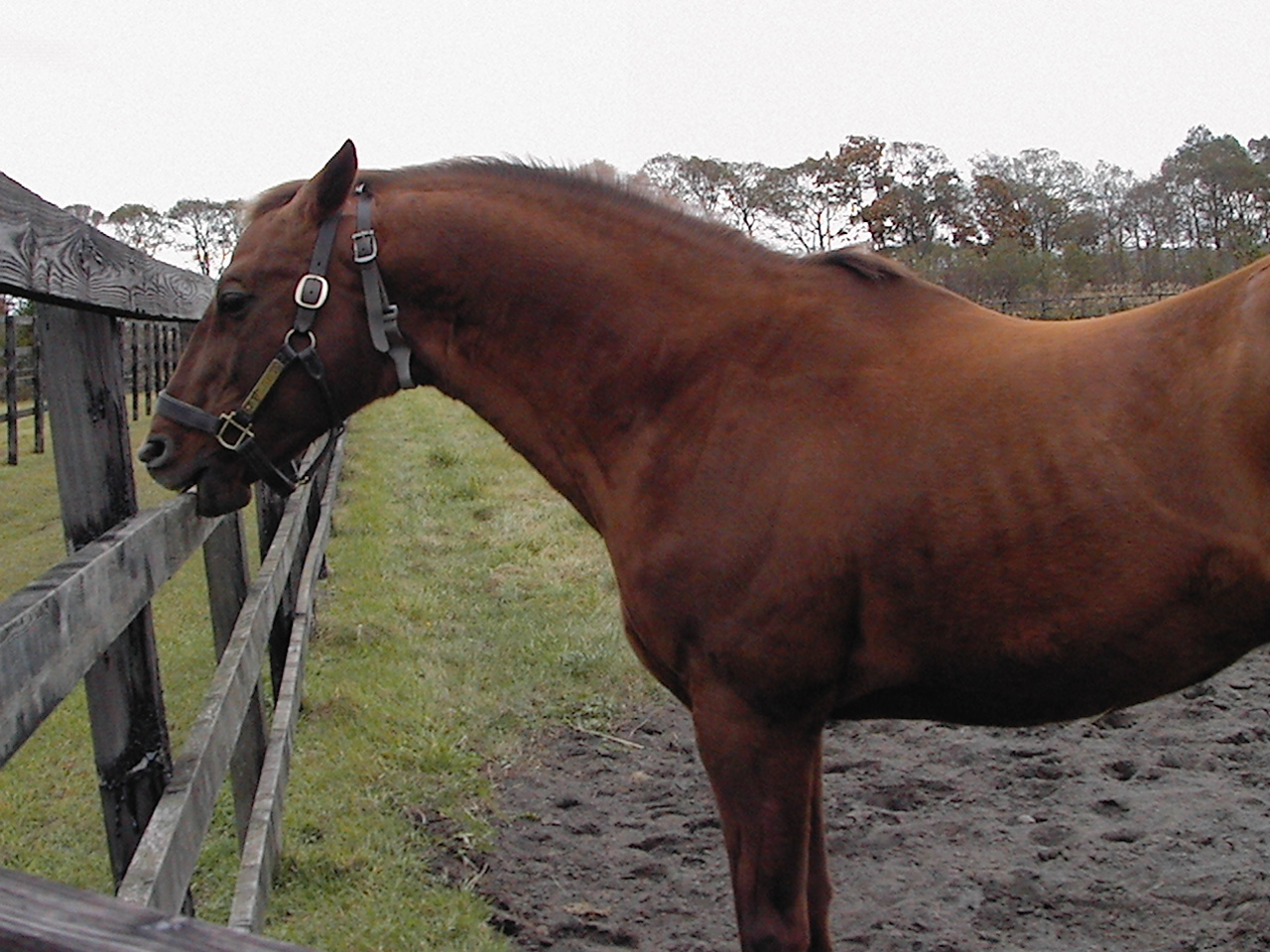
A horse cribbing on a wooden fence, note anti-cribbing collar intended to reduce this behavior and tension in neck muscles

Cribbing is a form of stereotypy (equine oral stereotypic behaviour), otherwise known as wind-sucking or crib-biting. Cribbing is considered to be an abnormal, compulsive behavior seen in some horses, and is often labelled a stable vice. The major factors that cause cribbing include stress, stable management, genetic and gastrointestinal irritability.

Cribbing was mentioned in the literature as early as 1578 and occurs in 2.4–8.3% of horses depending on breed and management.

A similar but unrelated behavior, wood-chewing or lignophagia, is another undesirable habit observed in horses, but it does not involve sucking in air; the horse simply gnaws on wood rails or boards as if they were food.

== Description ==
Cribbing, or crib biting, involves a horse grasping a solid object such as the stall door or fence rail with its incisor teeth, arching its neck, and contracting the lower neck muscles to retract the larynx caudally. This movement is coincided with an in-rush of air through the crico-pharynx into the oesophagus producing the characteristic cribbing sound or grunt. Usually, air is not swallowed but returns to the pharynx. It is considered to be an abnormal, compulsive behavior or stereotypy, and often labelled as a stable vice.

Wind-sucking is a related behavior whereby the horse arches its neck and sucks air into the windpipe but does so without grasping an object. Wind-sucking is thought to form part of the mechanism of cribbing, rather than being defined as an entirely separate behavior.

=== Wood-chewing ===
A similar, but unrelated behavior, wood-chewing (lignophagia), is another undesirable behavior sometimes observed in horses. The horse gnaws on wood rails or boards as if they were food, but it does not involve sucking in air.

== Prevalence and incidence ==
It is reported that 2.4–8.3% of horses in Europe and Canada are cribbers and that cribbing can occupy 15–65% of an individual horse's daily time budget. A postal survey in 2009 found that an average of 4.4% horses in the US are cribbers, but 13.3% of Thoroughbreds perform the behavior. Young Thoroughbred and part-Thoroughbred horses fed concentrated food after weaning are four times more likely to become cribbers than foals not fed concentrate. In several studies, Thoroughbreds consistently have the greatest prevalence of cribbing compared to other breeds. It was found that 11.03% of racehorses performed one or more abnormal stereotypical behaviour that lead back to animal welfare and husbandry systems.

Wind-sucking occurs in 3.8% of non-racing horses in the US. One study shows that stereotypes in general, including cribbing, are more prevalent in dressage horses compared to several other uses.

Geldings and stallions are more likely to exhibit cribbing than mares and the behavior has been reported as occurring in horses on pasture.

== Health effects ==
There is evidence that stomach ulcers may lead to a horse becoming a cribber, and that cribbing may be a coping mechanism in response to stress.

A 1998 study found that cribbing increased endorphins and found no evidence that cribbing generally impairs the health of affected horses, but later studies reported that cribbing and wind-sucking were related to a history of colic or the subsequent development of colic. A study found that horses would perform the cribbing behaviour in attempt to decrease the cortisol levels that can be brought on by stressful situations. According to this study, the long-term release of stress hormones can be harmful and can cause cardiovascular diseases, depression and immunosuppression.

== Causes ==
Boredom, stress, habit, and addiction are all possible causes of cribbing and wind-sucking. It was proposed in a 2002 study that the link between intestinal conditions such as gastric inflammation or colic and abnormal oral behavior was attributable to environmental factors. There is evidence that stomach ulcers may be correlated to a horse becoming a cribber.

Stress is induced when environmental demands produce a physiological response, if that response has a long duration period, it exceeds the normal, natural regulatory ability of the organism. Stress has been found to be a major contributing factor to horses developing this oral stereotypic behaviour. A study suggested that the animal uses cribbing as a coping method when it cannot escape a fearful or stressful situation, or when it has been socially isolated or confined.

Researchers now generally agree that cribbing and wind-sucking occur most often in stabled horses, although once established in an individual horse, the horse may exhibit these behaviors in other places. Recent studies indicate cribbing occurs more frequently in horses that were stable-weaned as foals than in those that were pasture-weaned. In the same study, feeding concentrates after weaning was associated with a fourfold increase in the rate of development of cribbing. The most popular cases of crib-biting come from racetracks, and it is believed to have derived from husbandry systems at the racetracks. The issue with these systems is that the social tendencies of the herd animal have been disrupted. Therefore, they are lacking social interaction and stimulation.

Because Thoroughbreds are so consistently the most prevalent cribbers, this suggests there may be a genetic component, however, this may be confounded by different uses and management of different horse breeds. It was found that Thoroughbreds are three times more likely to develop this stereotypy than any other breed, supporting that this may be a genetic component. Another study suggesting that cribbing may be genetic found that Warmbloods were also more likely to perform this behaviour when compared to other breeds. It was also found that the descendants of a crib-biter were more likely to perform the behaviour due to a genetic component.

Gastrointestinal environment and feeding routines were also a crucial topic, hinting that perhaps grain concentrations, grain ratios and forages were the main cause of ulcers, causing the animal to perform the oral stereotypy as a method of comfort. Horses that were unable to partake in a feeding behaviour that it wants to partake in would influence cribbing. Since the animal is unable to easily digest large quantities of starch, it was found that a high-grain, low forage diet could cause cribbing. A low-forage, high-grain diet was found to increase the risk of the stereotypy because the behaviour aided with relieving stomach acidity.

It has been anecdotally claimed that horses can learn to copy these behaviors from other horses, although this has not been substantiated by scientific study. A study in 2009 found that 48.8% of US horse owners believed that cribbing could be learned by observation, but research demonstrated that only 1.0% of horses developed cribbing after being housed in sight of an affected horse.

== Functions ==
Stereotypies are sometimes considered to be a coping mechanism for animals experiencing stress. A physiological stress response can be induced by injecting an animal with ACTH and the animal's ability to cope with this stress can be monitored by measuring salivary cortisol. In a 2015 study, after ACTH injection, cribbers had higher cortisol levels than non-cribbers. Furthermore, cribbers which did not perform the stereotypy during the 3-hrs of testing had higher cortisol levels than non-cribbers, whereas those performing the stereotypy did not. The researchers concluded that cribbing is a coping mechanism to stressful situations and that because of this, it should not be prevented.

Cribbing and wind-sucking may cause a sensation of pleasure by releasing endorphins in the horse's brain. It has also been suggested that the increase in saliva produced during wind-sucking could be a mechanism for neutralizing stomach conditions in stable-kept, grain-fed horses. Stereotypies have been defined as "repetitive, invariant behaviour patterns with no obvious goal or function", therefore, if cribbing and wind-sucking have one of the above possible functions, it may be inappropriate to label them as a stereotypy. However, as the causes and resulting reinforcement for these behaviors are probably multifactorial and they remain abnormal behaviors, this indicates that husbandry changes are needed for animals that exhibit cribbing or wind-sucking.

A study suggested was that ghrelin levels were higher in a crib-biting horse than in those who did not perform the behaviour. Cribbing also increased salivary secretion. However, a different study found that there was no relation between salivary secretion and reducing gastric acidity. Meaning that cribbing did not provide comfort for ulcers, rather that it stimulated/caused this issue.

== Treatment ==
Several methods have been devised to prevent cribbing once the behavior has started. However, some ethologists have argued that prevention of the behavior without addressing the causes is not a cure and may result in cribbing being expressed in a modified form, or may interfere with an animal's attempt to adapt to its environment.

=== Dietary and management ===
It has been shown that feeding cribbing horses an antacid diet can significantly reduce the frequency of the behavior. Current research indicates that the prevention of cribbing and related behavior is based upon management conditions which allow daily free movement and feeding practices that provide higher amounts of roughage and limited amounts of concentrates. A growing body of work suggests that fat and fiber-based diets may also result in calmer patterns of behavior.

One study investigated the effects of providing a feeder that delivered small amounts of concentrate feed when activated by the animal. The feeder increased the feeding time of both cribbers and non-cribbers, however, although the feeder decreased cribbing, it increased again once the feeder was removed.

=== Physical devices ===
There are a number of traditional devices used to minimize or prevent cribbing and wind-sucking. However, the effectiveness of these methods is arguable since they do not address the underlying causal factors. If the behaviour is stress related, the use of a cribbing collar may be counterproductive because it would not allow the animal to release the stress hormones by performing the behaviour and that cribbing may be beneficial in reducing stress. One method involves the horse wearing a collar-like device that stops a horse from arching and swelling its neck to suck in air. However, one of the only studies of the equipment showed that although wearing such a collar for 24 hours reduced cribbing in six of eight horses, once the collar was removed, cribbing returned to greater levels than before. The authors concluded cribbing has a function and that preventing this by using anti-cribbing collars may compromise the horse's welfare.

Covering exposed edges with metal or wire or painting surfaces with bitter substances such as carbolineum or a commercial "chew stop" product may reduce chewing-related damage to surfaces, though this does not prevent edges from being gripped by the teeth.

=== Surgical and others ===
Other methods to prevent cribbing have included surgery, acupuncture, use of pharmaceuticals, operant feeding, and environmental enrichment. However, a study found that the use of pharmaceuticals was expensive, less popular and less effective.

One surgical technique is the modified Forssell's procedure in which muscles and nerves in the ventral neck region are cut as well as some muscle tissue being removed. This makes it more difficult for a horse to contract the larynx and exhibit cribbing. An adaptation of this technique using a laser has proved successful in preventing some cribbers from exhibiting the behavior, although this was less successful in horses which had been cribbers for more than three years prior to the surgery. It has been found that this method was successful in 84.4% of cases. For those that the surgery was not found to be effective, relapse time occurred within six months to two years after the surgery had taken place.
