= Lignophagia =

Consumption of wood

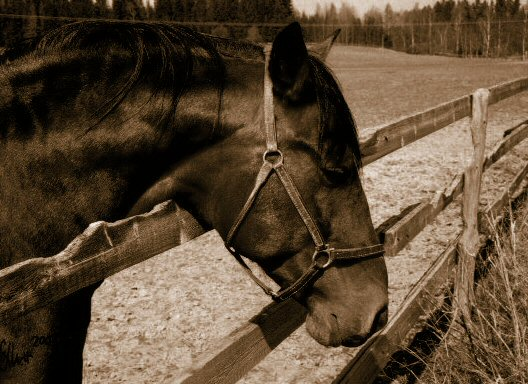
Wood-chewing may cause serious damage to wooden fences and stalls

Lignophagia is the abnormal behaviour of chewing and eating wood. It has been recorded in several species, but perhaps most commonly in horses where it is usually called, simply, "wood chewing". Lignophagia is a form of the pica disorder, in which normally non-nutritive substances are chewed or eaten. For some animals, wood is the normal primary food source; such animals are known as being xylophagous.

A related stereotypy in horses is cribbing, where a horse grabs a board or other edged object with its teeth, arches its neck and sucks in air. While this activity may cause some tooth marks on the surface used, this is not the same disorder as lignophagia.

== Etymology ==
Lignophagia is derived from the Latin lignum, meaning "wood", and the Greek phago, meaning "to eat".

== In horses ==
Horses often gnaw on wood rails, fences or boards as if they were food. This has been linked with dietary deficiencies, and often can be remedied with a balanced diet or dietary supplementation. Lignophagia in horses can be a cause of colic due to the ingestion of wood splinters, and in severe cases, can cause excessive wearing and deterioration of the teeth. A related vice is cribbing, wherein the horse grabs a wood board and sucks in air; not all wood-chewing is cribbing and though cribbing may also result in chewing on the wood surface, the two vices are not identical.

Colic can be a consequence of wood chewing due to the ingestion of wood splinters. Both cribbing and wood chewing can cause excessive wearing and deterioration of the teeth in severe cases. Horses displaying these behaviors may be devalued, as less desirable to potential buyers.

Wood chewing also is destructive to barns and fences, sometimes requiring costly repairs and ongoing maintenance.

Wood chewing has been linked with dietary deficiencies, and often can be remedied with a balanced diet or dietary supplementation. Some cases are thought to be linked to boredom or anxiety, often related to confinement.

== In dogs ==
Dogs sometimes eat wood which can have negative consequences. Sometimes they will chew the furniture of their owners meaning items must be replaced. Splinters may lodge in the mouth, gums or tongue, causing a depressed appetite. The wood can perforate or block the oesophagus or the intestine, often requiring surgery. Chemically treated wood can result in poisoning. A potential cause for lignophagia in dogs is being confined in an area with wet wood and having a diet lacking in proper nutrition.

== In humans ==
Humans sometimes chew or eat wood, e.g. pencils. In humans, eating wood is sometimes referred to as xylophagia and is considered a form of pica.

Chewing wood has also been used for oral hygiene throughout human history and is still popular today in some parts of the world, such as datwoon in India and miswak in predominantly Muslim areas.
