= Adjunctive behaviour =

Adjunctive behaviour occurs when an animal expresses an activity reliably accompanying some other response that has been produced by a stimulus, especially when the stimulus is presented according to a temporally defined schedule. For example, in 1960, psychologist John Falk was studying hungry rats that had been trained to press a lever for a small food pellet. Once a rat had received a pellet, it was obliged to wait an average of one minute before another press of the lever would be rewarded. The rats developed the habit of drinking water during these intervals, but their consumption far exceeded what was expected. Many consumed three to four times their normal daily water intake during a three-hour session, and some drank nearly half of their body weight in water during this time. Further research has revealed that intermittent food presentation to a variety of organisms results in an inordinately excessive consumption of water as well as other behaviours including attack, pica, escape, and alcohol consumption.

In psychological terminology, adjunctive behaviour is non-contingent behaviour maintained by an event which acquires a reinforcing effect due to some other reinforcing contingency. Some usages emphasize the stimulus rather than the responding it engenders (e.g., in rats, food presentations typically produce eating reliably followed by drinking; the drinking is adjunctive and is sometimes said to be induced by the schedule of food presentation).

== Use in science ==
Adjunctive behaviour has been used as evidence of animal welfare problems. Pregnant sows are typically fed only a fraction of the amount of food they would consume by choice, and they remain hungry for almost the whole day. If a water dispenser is available, some sows will drink two or three times their normal daily intake, and under winter conditions, warming this amount of cold water to body temperature, only to discharge it as dilute urine, involves an appreciable caloric cost. However, if such sows are given a bulky high-fibre food (which under typical circumstances would result in an increase in water intake), they spend much longer eating, and the excessive drinking largely disappears. In this case, much of the sows' water intake appeared to be adjunctive drinking that was not linked to thirst.

== See also ==
- List of abnormal behaviours in animals
