= Carbolineum =

Mixture of coal tar components

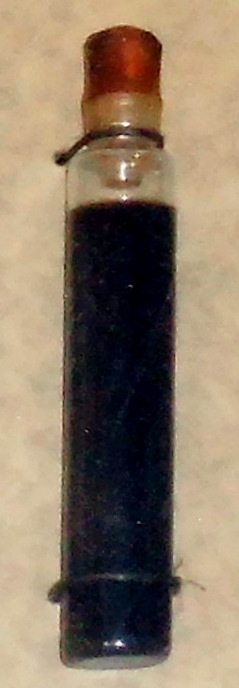
Carbolineum

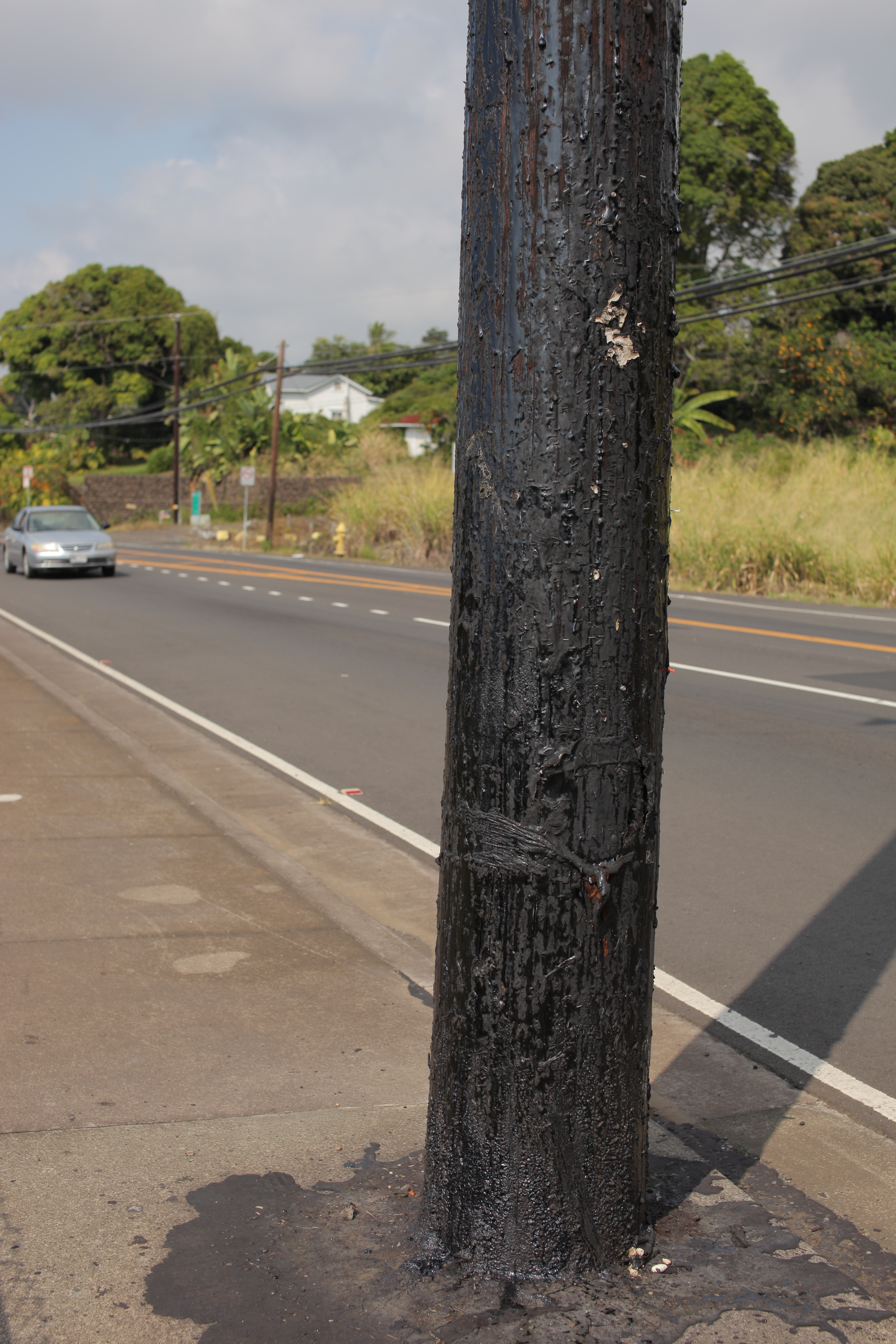
Telephone pole treated with carbolineum in Hawaii

Carbolineum is an oily, water-insoluble, flammable, dark brown mixture from coal tar components, smelling of tar. It contains among other things anthracene and phenol.

Because of its rot-resisting and disinfecting effect, Carbolineum was used over many years for the preservation of wooden structures such as railroad ties, telephone poles, cabins, etc.

More recently, its use has been limited and/or forbidden by the introduction of stricter environmental regulations.

== See also ==
- Creosote
