= Weaving (horse) =

Horse behavior

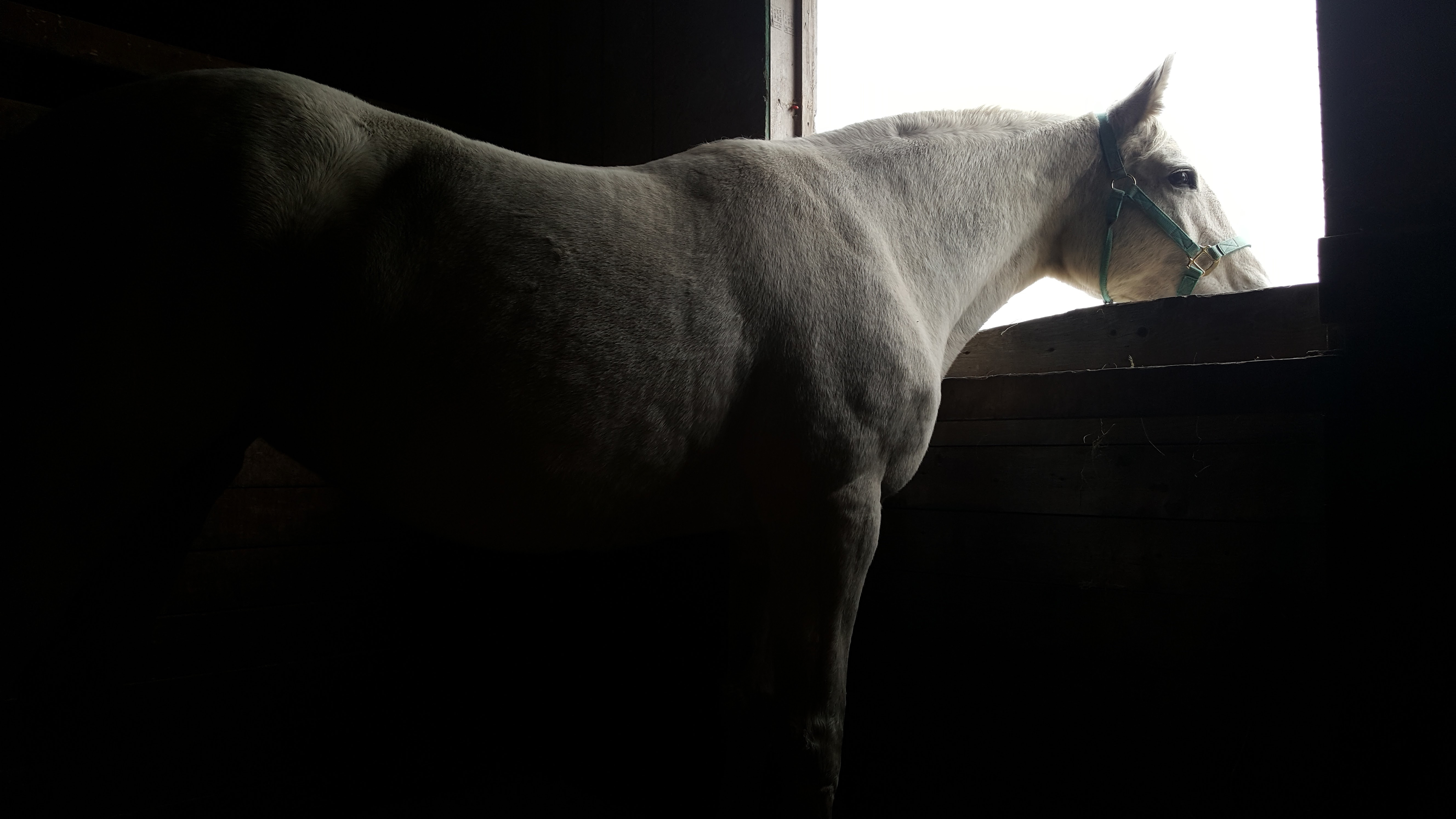
Providing visual stimulation (an open window to the outside) to a stalled horse reduces risk of stable vice occurrence

Weaving is a behaviour in horses that is classified as a stable vice, in which the horse repetitively sways on its forelegs, shifting its weight back and forth by moving the head and neck side to side. It may also include swaying of the rest of the body and picking up the front legs. Some horses exhibit non-stereotypical weaving, and instead engage in variations on this behavior.

== Causes ==
Ultimately, the housing condition of horses is considered to be the cause of stable vices such as weaving. There are no reports of wild horses displaying weaving behaviour, mainly because these horses are in their natural state, i.e. they are not confined or on a schedule. Domestic horses are often housed in stalls (typically 8x8 or 12x12) at night, and are allowed turnout (i.e. time outside) during the day. Horses that are housed in solitary confinement from other horses, or those that do not get daily turnout, or inadequate turnout, are more at risk for developing stable vices such as weaving.

Horses often perform this vice due to stress. Horses tend to weave near the door of their stall, possibly because they desire to leave the stall to move around. Horses also sometimes weave near a window to the aisle or the exterior of the stable, which would provide visual stimulation.

Stress during critical periods such as weaning may also contribute to the development of stables vices.

However, some horses that have developed the habit will also weave while turned out, signifying that the problem is not solely one of confinement.

Many equestrians believe weaving is a learned habit. However, some experts theorize that weaving could more likely develop in horses with a genetic predisposition to it. Thus, there is a debate over whether weaving is a learned behavior that horses pick up by observing another horse who weaves, or if it is an inborn tendency that develops under a certain set of environmental conditions. These two arguments fail to take into account the fact that most behaviours can be both genetically and environmentally influenced. It is possible that both sides are correct to some extent. Horses that exhibit non-stereotypical weaving do not necessarily begin after watching another horse weaving (stereotypical or non-stereotypical), suggesting that horses can begin weaving without learning it from another horse.

Some people claim that it is usually safe to allow other horses to see a weaver, unless it is known that the horse may be genetically predisposed (their sire or dam was a weaver). Others feel it is caused by environmental factors, and that other horses in the same setting will pick up the behavior once a single horse starts. However, this may be due to all horses experiencing similar stresses, and thus engaging in similar behavior.

Weaving may also be caused by anticipation of predictable events such as feeding or turnout, as the behavior has been observed to increase prior to these events.

== Negative effects ==
Weaving is generally not a very damaging vice over short periods of time, but horses that are consistent weavers may show abnormal hoof wear, and stress on their joints (which can cause lameness). Damage to the stall floor may also occur. The overall value of a horse is not necessarily diminished by its weaving, but the underlying cause of stress or boredom that is causing the behavior should be investigated and rectified to ensure the horse's well-being.

Weaving is also linked to weight loss, uneven muscle development, and performance problems.

== Management ==
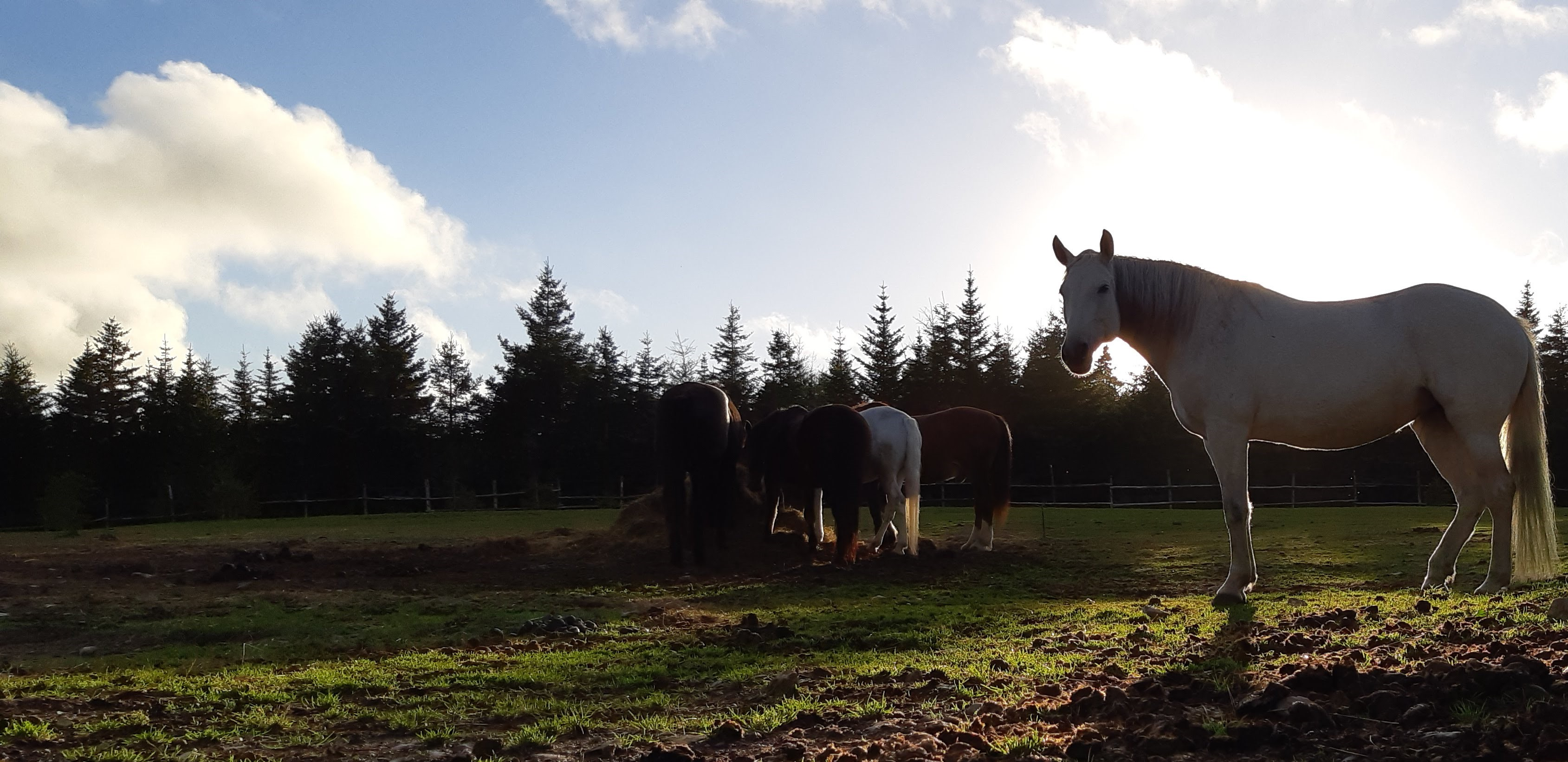
Providing a large turnout area, and free-choice hay reduces stress by mimicking a horses natural environment, and therefore reduces risk of weaving behaviour.

Like most vices, weaving is a very difficult habit to break, and may not disappear even after the original problem has been resolved. However, there are several ways to manage a weaver and reduce its stress:

- Allow a weaver to see other horses, even if he is stalled separately.
- Provide a companion for the horse, if possible. Some options include goats, cats, or chickens.
- Provide visual stimulation. In a stall, an open window often helps the situation.
- Keep the horse occupied when stalled. For example, provide a good-quality continuous hay or a toy.
- Allow the horse to spend more time outside of its stall. This mimics a horse's natural environment and should reduce stress levels.
- Hanging a mirror in a stall often helps weaving, because the horse believes there is a nearby horse. This trick is often very effective, and recent studies in the UK have demonstrated that it can reduce weaving by 97%. Note that the mirror should be made from stainless steel to minimize safety concerns.
- Feed a high-quality, high-fiber hay and/or grain to reduce feeding frustration. Consistent feeding times and quality is important, and try to find ways to increase eating time (hay nets).
- Try not to feed wean-age horses concentrated feed (grain), as this can increase stress levels and frustration.
- Alter stall design if horse weaves over door. V-shaped anti-weaving bars prevent weaving. This method is strictly a prevention, and may actually increase the horse's frustration.
- Increasing horse's exercise, especially if it has limited turnout time during the day.
- Pay particular attention to lowering levels of stress during critical periods in a horse's life, especially during weaning. Gradual weaning techniques have been shown to reduce the risk of developing stable vices.

== See also ==
- Horse care
- Horse behavior
