= Fixed action pattern =

Instinctive animal behavior

In the study of animal behavior, a fixed action pattern is an instinctive behavioral sequence that is highly stereotyped and species-characteristic. Fixed action patterns are said to be produced by the innate releasing mechanism, a "hard-wired" neural network, in response to a sign/key stimulus or releaser. Once released, a fixed action pattern runs to completion.

This term is often associated with Konrad Lorenz, who is the founder of the concept. Lorenz identified six characteristics of fixed action patterns. These characteristics state that fixed action patterns are stereotyped, complex, species-characteristic, released, triggered, and independent of experience.

Fixed action patterns have been observed in many species, but most notably in fish and birds. Classic studies by Konrad Lorenz and Niko Tinbergen involve male stickleback mating behavior and greylag goose egg-retrieval behavior.

Fixed action patterns have been shown to be evolutionarily advantageous, as they increase both fitness and speed. However, as a result of their predictability, they may also be used as a means of exploitation. An example of this exploitation is brood parasitism.

There are four exceptions to fixed action pattern rules: reduced response threshold, vacuum activity, displacement behavior, and graded response.

== Characteristics ==
There are six characteristics of fixed action patterns. Fixed action patterns are said to be stereotyped, complex, species-characteristic, released, triggered, and independent of experience.

- Stereotyped: Fixed action patterns occur in rigid, predictable, and highly-structured sequences.
- Complex: Fixed action patterns are not a simple reflex. They are a complex pattern of behavior.
- Species-characteristic: Fixed action patterns occur in all members of a species of a certain sex and/or a given age when they have attained a specific level of arousal.
- Released: Fixed action patterns occur in response to a certain sign stimulus or releaser.
- Triggered: Once released, a fixed action pattern continues to completion, even when there are changes in the surrounding environment.
- Independent of experience: A fixed action pattern is not learned. This is known as a fixed action pattern is complete upon the very first release.

== Sign stimulus ==
The sign stimulus, also known as key stimulus or releaser, is the determining feature of a stimulus that produces a response. Sign stimuli are often found when observing a fixed action pattern (FAP) that is an innate behaviour with very little variance in the manner in which the actions are executed. Several examples of sign stimuli can be seen through the observation of animal behaviour in their natural environment. Experimenters have gone into these natural environments to better assess the stimuli and determine the key features of them that elicit a fixed action pattern. Scientists have also observed direct exploitation of sign stimuli in nature among different species of birds.

Fixed action patterns are released due to certain external stimuli. These stimuli are single or a small group of attributes of an object, not the object as a whole. These attributes may include color, shape, odor, and sound.

Exaggerated models of these attributes are called supernormal stimuli. A supernormal stimulus leads to an exaggerated response. Supernormal stimuli are more effective at releasing a response than a natural stimulus.

An external stimulus that elicits a fixed action pattern is termed a sign stimulus if the stimuli emanates from the environment, whereas a releaser emanates from one's own species.

=== Supernormal stimuli ===
When conducting further experiments, scientists came across the idea of supernormal stimuli. Nikolaas Tinbergen found that incubating geese when given the choice between performing the egg-rolling FAP with an egg versus a full-sized volleyball, they chose the volleyball. These supernormal stimuli, although not naturally occurring, gave insight into the process of natural selection and how it may be that some stimulus features such as the size of the egg result in an increased ability to trigger a FAP.

== Examples ==
=== Male stickleback mating behavior ===
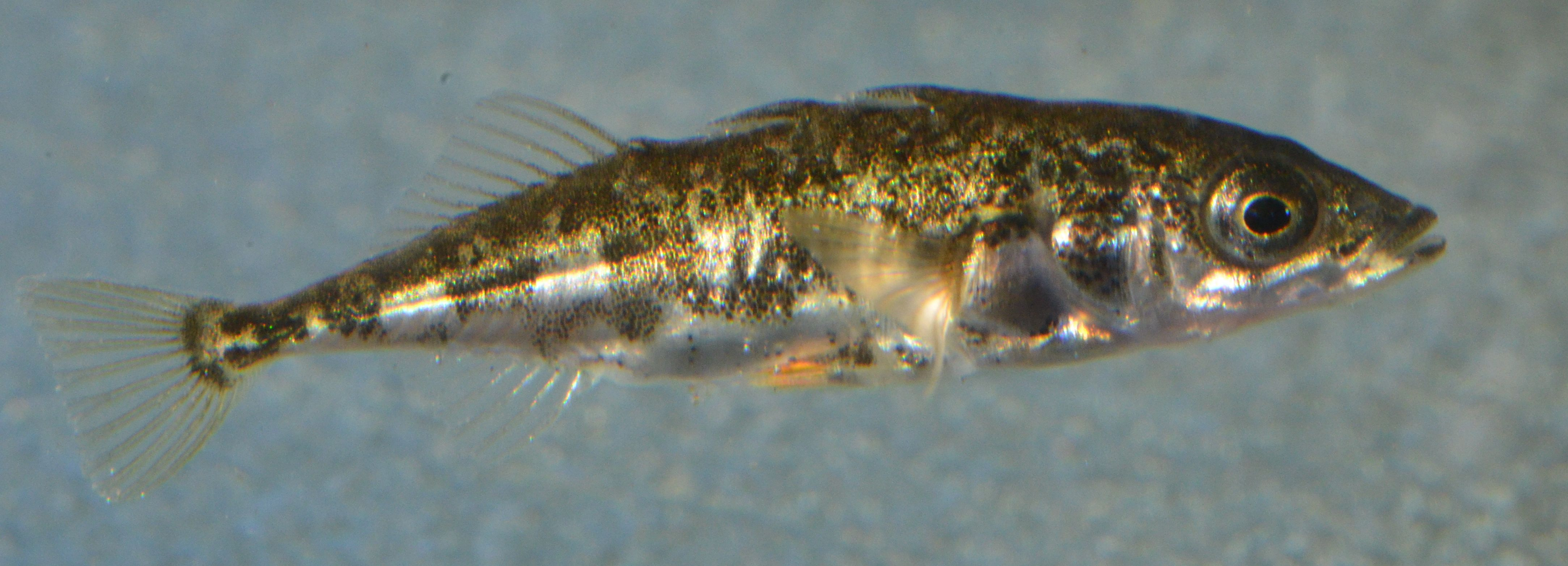
A three-spined stickleback like those used in Tinbergen's experiments

One example of fixed action patterns is the courtship and aggression behaviours of the male stickleback, particularly the three-spined stickleback, during mating season, described in a series of studies by Niko Tinbergen. During the spring mating season, male sticklebacks' ventrum turns red and they establish a territory to build a nest. They attack other male sticklebacks that enter their territory, but court females and entice them to enter the nest to lay their eggs. Tinbergen used models of sticklebacks to investigate which features of male and female sticklebacks elicited attack and courtship behavior from male sticklebacks. Tinbergen's main findings were that male sticklebacks responded in a relatively invariant way and attacked even the most crude of models with a red belly, but in contrast, courted a model with a swollen belly. He also found that when presented with both a real male stickleback and a crude model, if the model's stomach was more red, the stickleback would attack the model as opposed to the other real male stickleback.

=== Greylag goose egg-retrieval behavior ===
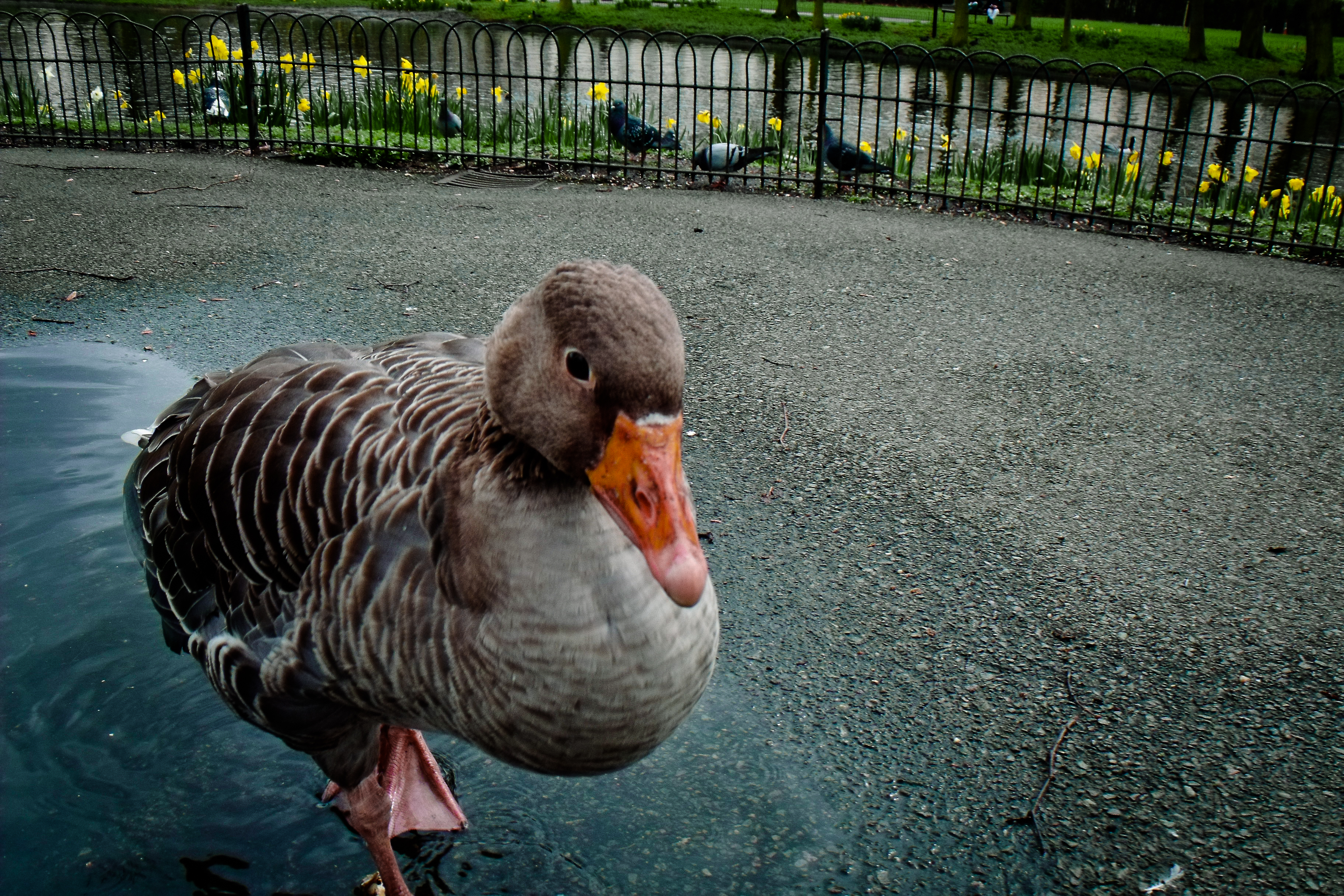
A greylag goose which participates in the described egg-retrieval behavior

Another example of a behavior that has been described as a fixed action pattern is the egg-retrieval behavior of the greylag goose, reported in classic studies by Niko Tinbergen and Konrad Lorenz. Like many ground-nesting birds, if an egg becomes displaced from the nest, the greylag rolls it back to the nest with its beak. The sight of the displaced egg is the sign stimulus and elicits the egg-retrieval behavior. First, the goose fixates its sight on the egg. Next, it extends its neck over the egg. Finally, it rolls the egg back to the nest using the underside of its beak. If the egg is removed from the goose during the performance of egg-rolling, the bird will continue with the behavior, pulling its head back as if an imaginary egg is still being maneuvered. It has been shown that the greylag will also attempt to retrieve other egg-shaped objects, such as a golf ball, door knob, or even a model egg too large to have possibly been laid by the goose itself (i.e. a supernormal stimulus).

The sight of the egg outside of the nest serves as the stimulus in this particular instance because it is only after the recognition of the egg's displacement that the fixed action pattern occurs.

The manipulation of the sign stimulus through a series of experiments can allow scientists to understand what specific component of the stimulus is responsible for the innate behavioral sequence. If the egg were to be picked up and taken away after it is displaced from the nest, the goose still exhibits the same head moving motion even though there is no egg present. This was put to the test by using objects such as beer cans and baseballs. Experimenters found that the stimulus merely had to be an object that was large enough in size, convex enough in shape, and comfortable enough for the goose to lay its neck around the edges of the object.

These features that the stimulus has to obtain in order to trigger a resulting FAP were then given the official term of Sign Stimuli. Scientists came to the realization that there must be an innate deciphering method that the goose goes through in order to determine a suitable sign stimulus. This was defined as an innate releasing mechanism (IRM). The goose's IRM when put to the test in the natural world not being manipulated by scientific experimentation is almost always efficient in getting the desired item of an egg back into the nest.

=== Other examples of sign stimuli ===
More examples of sign stimuli include:

- The red mark on an adult's beak recognized by the chicks of various gull species.
- Light polarization patterns recognized by mayflies when they are deciding where to drop their eggs.
- The presence of a female sage grouse that causes males to exhibit a strut pattern display in order to attract the female during breeding season.

== Evolutionary advantages ==
Most behaviors which are both fixed action patterns and occur in more complex animals, are usually essential to the animal's fitness, or in which speed (i.e. an absence of learning) is a factor. For instance, the greylag goose's egg-retrieval behavior is so essential to the survival of its chicks that the fitness of the parent bird is increased by the behavior being relatively invariant. A stickleback will attack any male fish who enters his territory while the female is sexually receptive, reacting to their red color, while the female stickleback triggers behavior in the male resulting in the fertilization of her eggs.

== Evolutionary disadvantages ==
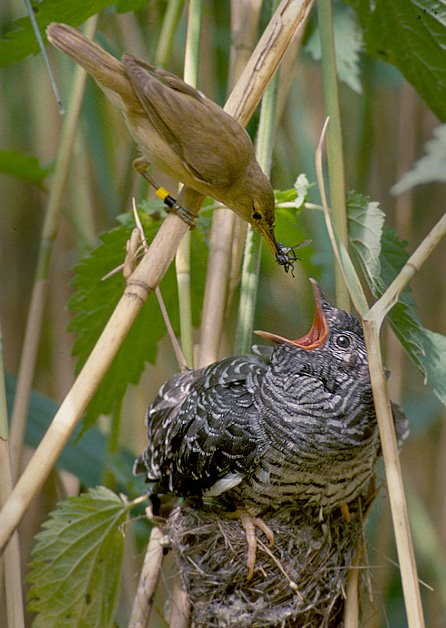
Brood parasites, such as the cuckoo, provide a supernormal stimulus to the parenting species, in this case a common reed warbler.

Fixed action patterns are predictable, as they are invariable, and therefore can lead to exploitation. Some species have evolved to exploit the fixed action patterns of other species by mimicry of their sign stimuli. Replicating the releaser required to trigger a fixed action pattern is known as code-breaking. A well-known example of this is brood parasitism, where one species will lay its eggs in the nest of another species, which will then parent its young. A young North American cowbird, for example, provides a supernormal stimulus to its foster parent, which will cause it to forage rapidly to satisfy the larger bird's demands. A nestling will provide higher levels of stimulus with noisier, more energetic behavior, communicating its urgent need for food. Parents in this situation have to work harder to provide food, otherwise their own offspring are likely to die of starvation.

=== Brood parasitism ===
The exploitation of sign stimuli can be seen when exploring the concept of brood parasitism. Other animals will learn the sign stimuli of different species and use it to manipulate the other animal into doing something for its own benefit. An example of this can be seen in the European cuckoo. This particular species of bird benefits by handing off the task of raising their young to other species of birds who will care for any egg that is found in its nest. In this case the sign stimulus is the presence of the eggs in the nest. If the other bird does not recognize the other bird's egg as foreign, it will continue on caring for it as its own by incubating it and hatching it. Once it is hatched, the young cuckoo ensures for itself a solid upbringing by instinctively pushing its neck around anything that is solid in the nest and pushing it over the edge. Thus classifying the sign stimulus as any solid object. This allows for the cuckoo's unwitting foster parents to have plenty of time to devote to caring for it without any other distractions.

== Exceptions ==
There are four exceptions to fixed action pattern rules. These include reduced response threshold, vacuum activity, displacement behavior, and graded response.

=== Reduced response threshold ===
Fixed action patterns become easier to release as time increases between the last release.

=== Vacuum activity ===
After so long without being released, fixed action patterns are released in the absence of the sign stimulus or releaser. Vacuum activity is demonstrated in courtship behavior of ring doves. Male blond ring doves isolated from their own species will resort to courting a pigeon, then a human's hand, and finally expressing courtship activity alone in their box, if they are left alone for a long period of time.

=== Displacement behavior ===
Fixed action patterns may be performed that are irrelevant to the stimulus present. This can be seen in sticklebacks. Displacement behavior occurs when the fighting and mating urges are frustrated. A male stickleback chasing another male stickleback stops where their two territories meet and dives to the bottom of the tank, picking something up. This behavior resembles that of nest digging during mating season, but is not released by the proper sign stimulus.

=== Graded response ===
Fixed action patterns may vary in intensity instead of being triggered.
