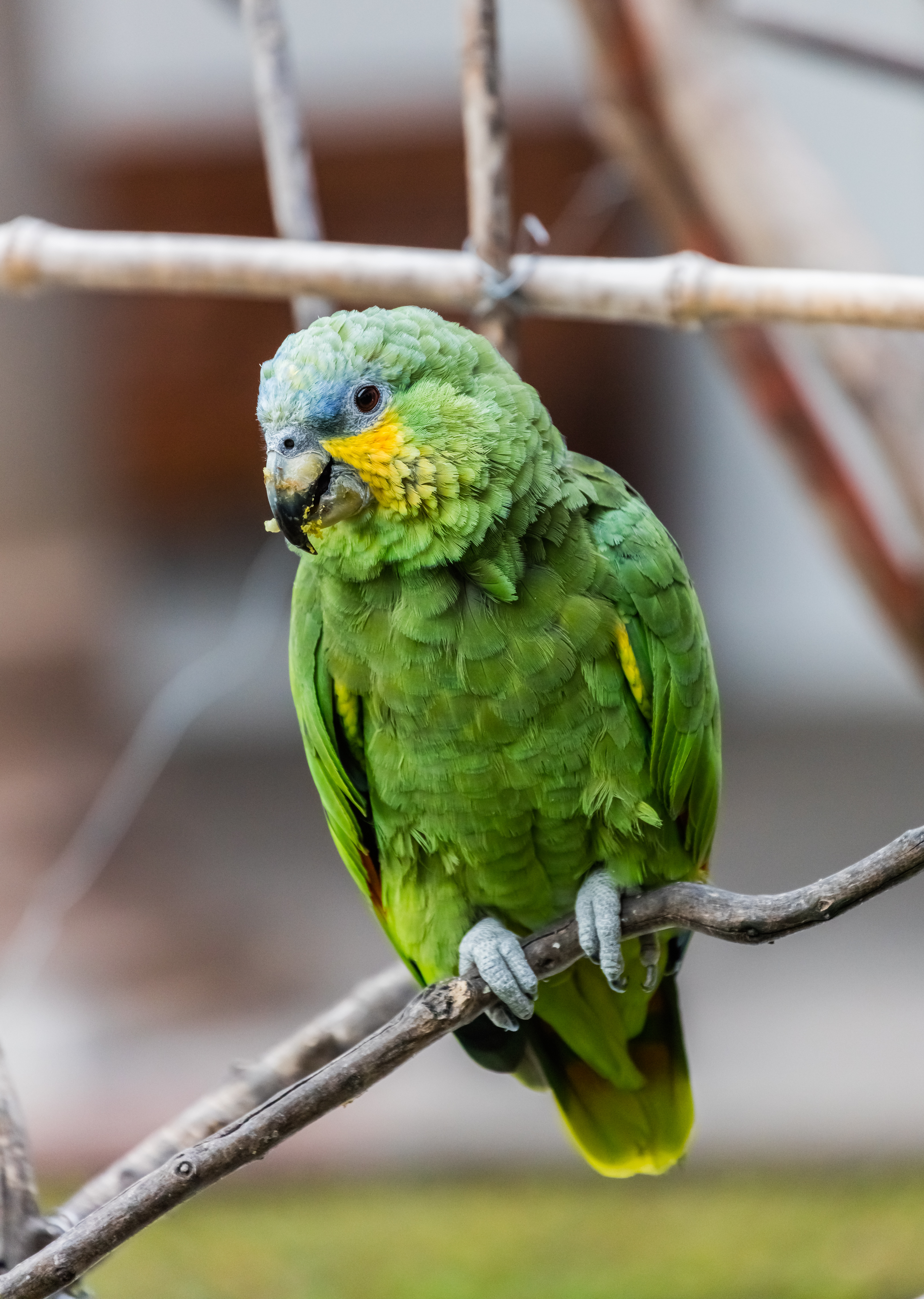
- A. a. amazonica, Ecuador
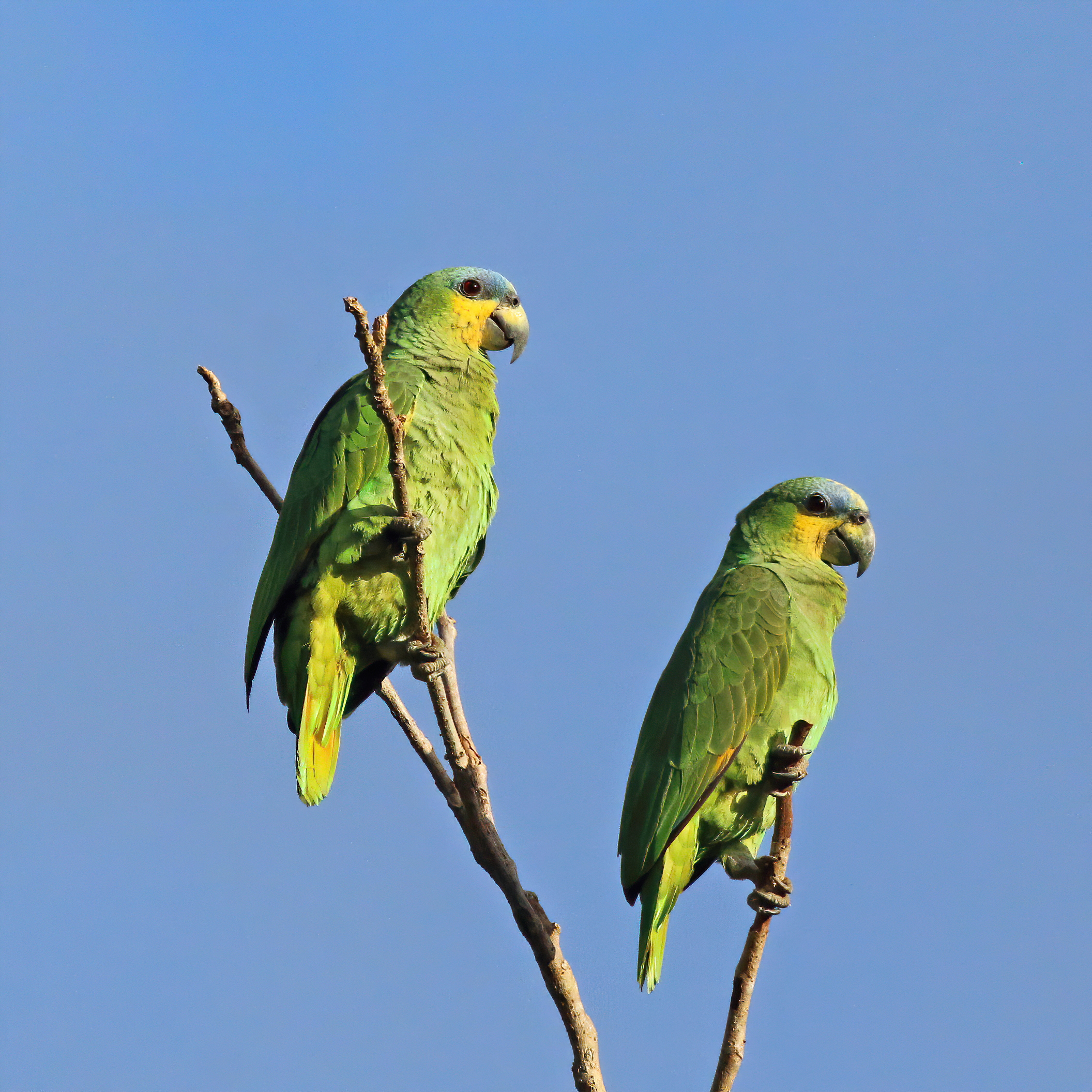
- A. a. tobagensis, Tobago

Conservation status
- Least Concern (IUCN 3.1)

Scientific classification
- Kingdom: Animalia
- Phylum: Chordata
- Class: Aves
- Order: Psittaciformes
- Family: Psittacidae
- Genus: Amazona
- Species: A. amazonica

Binomial name
- Amazona amazonica (Linnaeus, 1766)

Synonyms
- Psittacus amazonicus Linnaeus, 1766

= Orange-winged amazon =

Species of bird

The orange-winged amazon (Amazona amazonica), also known as orange-winged parrot and loro guaro, is a large amazon parrot. It is a resident breeding bird in tropical South America, from Colombia, Trinidad and Tobago south to Peru, Bolivia and central Brazil. Its habitat is forest and semi-open country. Although common, it is persecuted as an agricultural pest and by capture for the pet trade (over 66,000 captured from 1981 to 1985). It is also hunted as a food source. Introduced breeding populations have been reported in Puerto Rico and Tenerife in the Canary Islands.

== Taxonomy ==
The orange-winged amazon was formally described in 1766 by the Swedish naturalist Carl Linnaeus in the twelfth edition of his Systema Naturae He placed it with all the other parrots in the genus Psittacus and coined the binomial name Psittacus amazonicus. Linnaeus cited the 1760 description by the French zoologist Mathurin Jacques Brisson. Brisson used the French name "Le Perroquet Amazone" and the Latin name later used by Linnaeus, Psittacus amazonicus. Although Brisson coined Latin names, these do not conform to the binomial system and are not recognised by the International Commission on Zoological Nomenclature. The orange-winged amazon is now one of around 30 species placed in the genus Amazona that was introduced by the French naturalist René Lesson in 1830. The species is considered to be monotypic: no subspecies are recognised.

== Description ==
The orange-winged amazon is a mainly green parrot about 33 cm (13 in) long and weighing about 340 g. It has blue and yellow feathers on its head which varies in extent between individuals. The upper mandible is partly horn colored (gray) and partly dark-gray. It has orange feathers in the wings and tail, which can be seen when in flight. The male and female are identical in external appearance.

== Behavior ==
=== Diet and feeding ===
The orange-winged amazons are noisy birds and makes loud, high-pitched screams. It eats fruit, seeds, nuts, blossoms, leaf buds, and berries, including the fruit of palm trees and sometimes cocoa, mangoes, and oranges. It roosts communally in palm and other trees, and large numbers can be seen at the roost sites at dawn and dusk. It is becoming common as a feral bird in the Miami, Florida area, and there are colonies in London, England.

=== Breeding ===
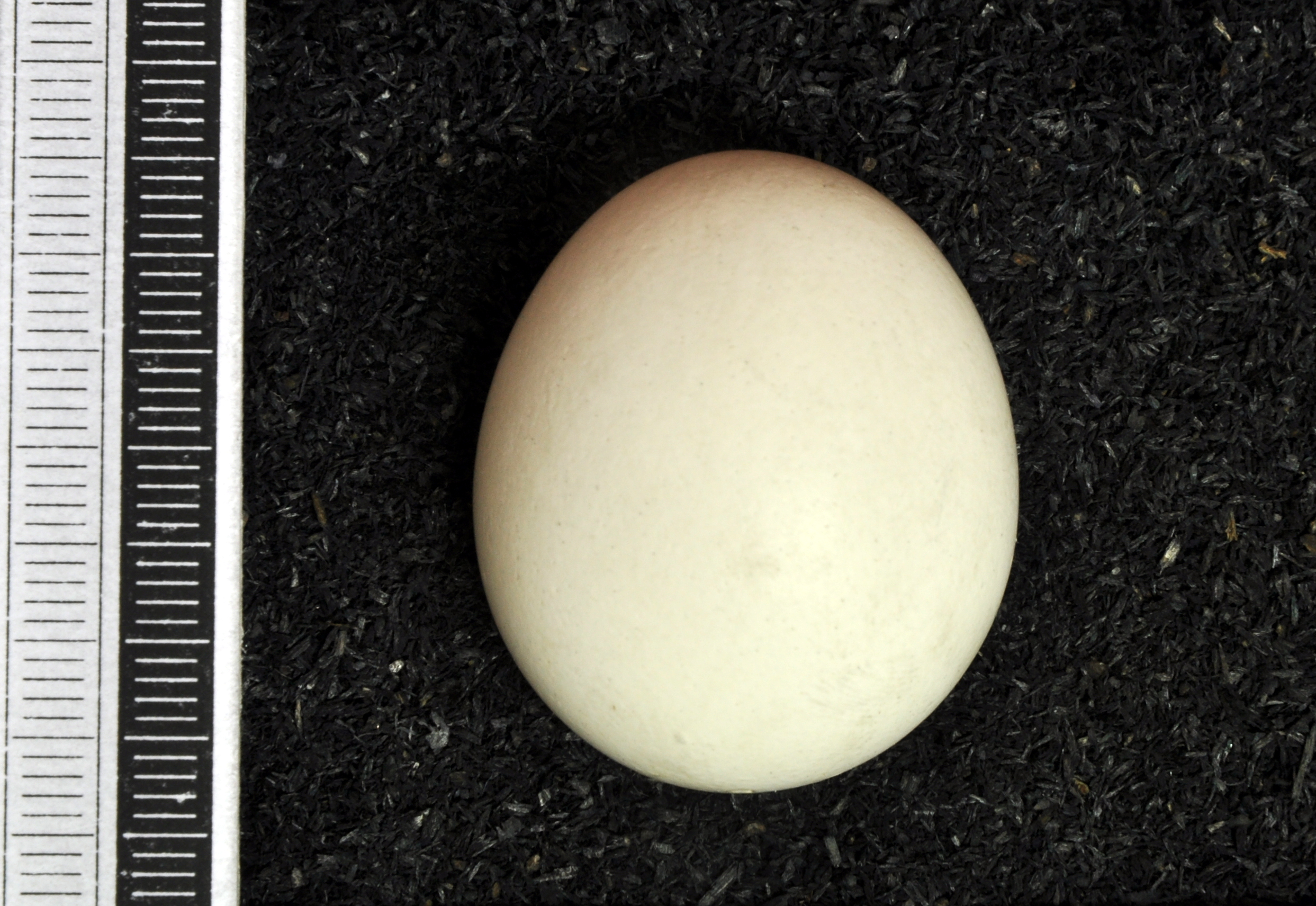
Egg, Collection Museum Wiesbaden

The orange-winged amazon nests in tree cavities. The eggs are white and there are usually three or four in a clutch. The female incubates the eggs for about 26 days and the chicks leave the nest about 60 days after hatching.

The orange-winged amazon has been introduced to Tenerife in the Canary Islands, where it has been observed successfully hybridizing with a feral scaly-headed parrot (Pionus maximiliani) and also attempting to breed with feral monk parakeet (Myiopsitta monachus) and rose-ringed parakeet (Psittacula krameri), even involving itself in the former species' unusual nest-building behaviour.
