= Outline of birds =

Overview of and topical guide to birds

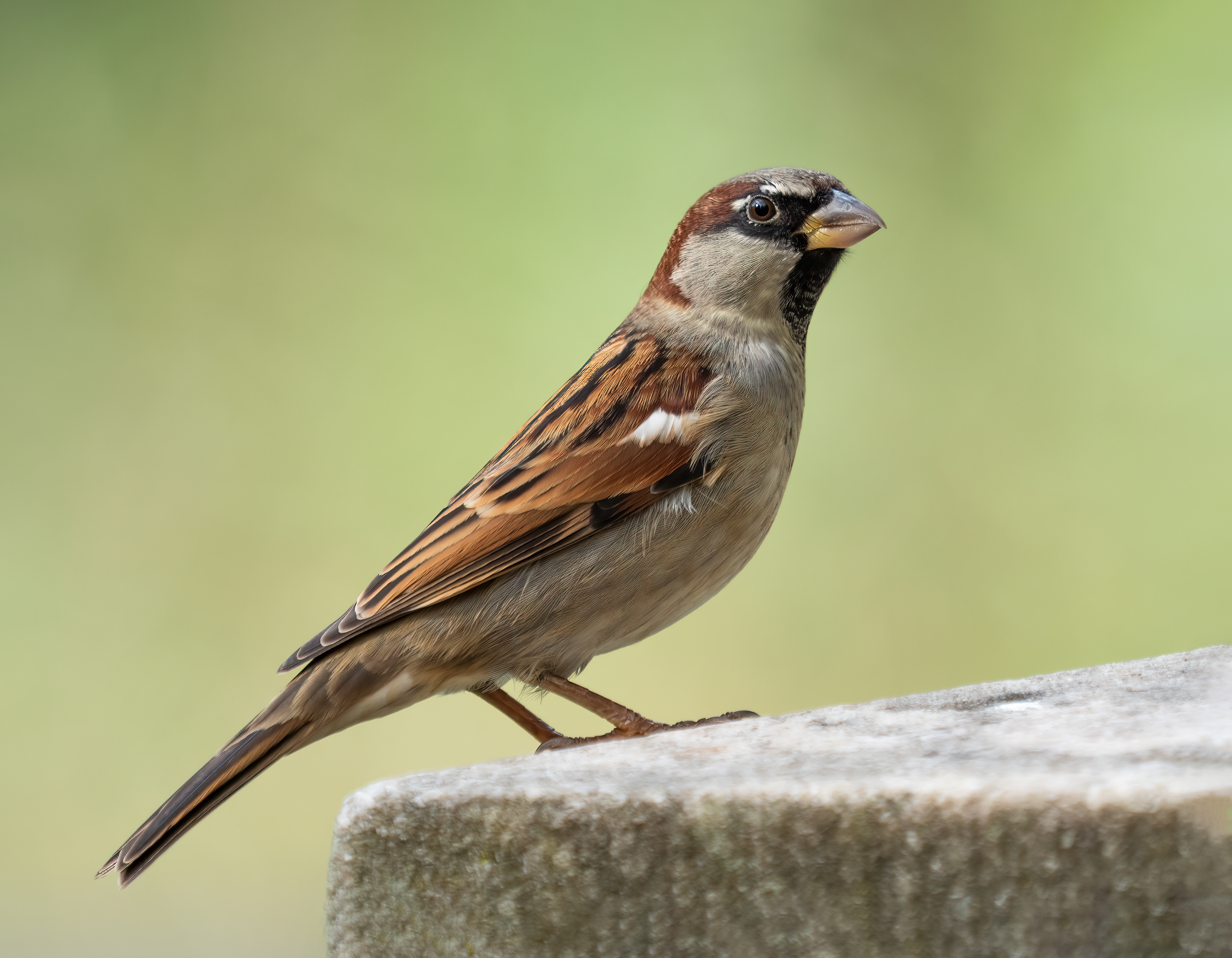
House sparrow, Passer domesticus

The following outline is provided as an overview of and topical guide to birds:

Birds (class Aves) – winged, bipedal, endothermic (warm-blooded), egg-laying, vertebrate animals. There are around 10,000 living species, making them the most varied of tetrapod vertebrates. They inhabit ecosystems across the globe, from the Arctic, to the Antarctic. Extant birds range in size from the 5 cm (2 in) bee hummingbird to the 2.75 m (9 ft) ostrich. Birds evolved from earlier theropods, and thus constitute the only known living dinosaurs.

== What type of thing is a bird? ==
A bird can be described as all of the following:

- Life form – entity or being that is living or alive.
  - Animal – multicellular, eukaryotic organisms of the kingdom Animalia (also called Metazoa). Their body plan eventually becomes fixed as they develop, although some undergo a process of metamorphosis later on in their lives. Most animals are motile, meaning they can move spontaneously and independently.

=== Biological classification ===
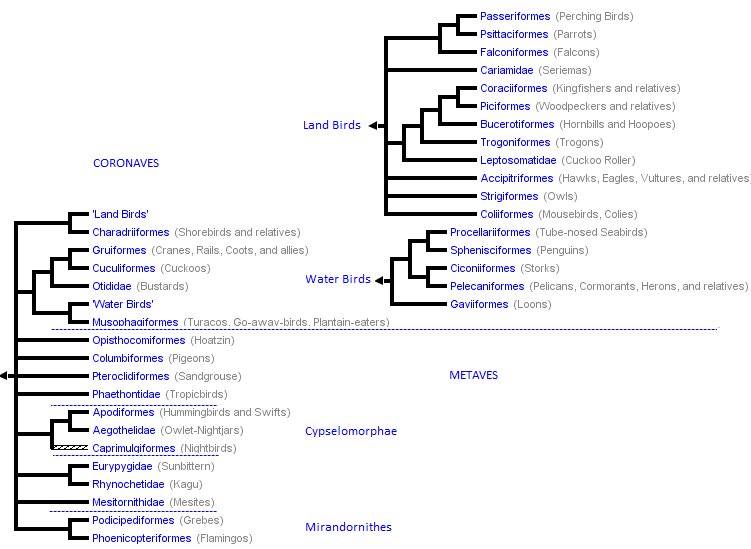
Cladogram showing the most recent classification of Neoaves, based on several phylogenetic studies

- Kingdom: Animalia
- Phylum: Chordata
- Clade: Dinosauria
- Clade: Theropoda
- Clade: Ornithurae
- Class: Aves

== Nature of birds ==
Bird

=== Bird anatomy ===
External anatomy (topography) of a typical bird: 1 Beak, 2 Head, 3 Iris, 4 Pupil, 5 Mantle, 6 Lesser coverts, 7 Scapulars, 8 Coverts, 9 Tertials, 10 Rump, 11 Primaries, 12 Vent, 13 Thigh, 14 Tibio-tarsal articulation, 15 Tarsus, 16 Feet, 17 Tibia, 18 Belly, 19 Flanks, 20 Breast, 21 Throat, 22 Wattle, 23 Eyestripe

Bird anatomy

- List of terms used in bird topography
- Beak
- Caruncle
- Comb
- Feathers
  - Alula
  - Barb (feather)
  - Barbule
  - Covert (feather)
  - Crest (feathers)
  - Down feather
  - Ear tuft
  - Feather holes
  - Feather-plucking
  - Flight feather
  - Pennaceous feather
  - Pin feather
  - Plumage
  - Quill
  - Speculum feather
- Gape
- Gizzard
- Preen gland
- Syrinx
- Vision
  - Nictitating membrane
  - Pecten oculi
- Uropygial gland
- Wattle

=== Bird behavior ===
Bird behavior

- Bird colony
- Feeding
  - Feeding of birds
  - Food plants
  - Gleaning (birds)
  - Hawking
  - Hoarding
  - Pellet (ornithology)
  - Plucking post
- Flight
  - Flightless birds
  - Flocking
- Migration
  - Flyway
    - Atlantic Flyway
    - Central Flyway
    - Central Asian Flyway
    - East Asian - Australasian Flyway
    - East Atlantic Flyway
    - Mississippi Flyway
    - Pacific Flyway
    - West Pacific Flyway
  - Pigeon intelligence
- Abnormal behaviour of birds in captivity
- Aggression
- Anting (bird activity)
- Begging behavior in birds
- Distraction display
- Dust bathing
- Feather-plucking
- Fecal sac
- Intelligence
- Mobbing
- Moult
- Preening
- Reproduction
  - Avian incubation
  - Bird-nesting
  - Brood parasite
  - Clutch (eggs)
  - Egg
  - Egg tossing
  - Fledgling
  - Homosexual behavior in birds
  - List of birds displaying homosexual behavior
  - Sexual behaviour
  - Nest
    - Altricial
    - Nest box
    - Precocial
  - Siblicide
- Roosting
  - Communal roosting
- Tracks
- Vocalization
- Sonation

== History of birds ==
- Bird evolution
  - Origin of birds
  - Origin of avian flight
  - Feathered dinosaurs
  - Archaeopteryx
  - Extinct birds

== Study of birds ==
- Avian ecology field methods
  - Bird census
    - Breeding bird survey
    - Christmas Bird Count
- Bird collections
- Bird feeding
  - Bird feeder
  - Bird food
  - Mealworm
  - Niger
  - Safflower
  - Suet
  - Sunflower seed
- Bird ichnology
  - Bird tracks
- Bird observatory
- Bird ringing
  - Cannon net
  - Mist net
- Bird watching
  - Bird hide
  - Field guide
  - Field mark
  - List of birdwatchers
  - List of birding books
  - Seawatching
    - List of seawatching locations by country
- Oology
  - Jourdain Society
  - Palaeooölogy

== Aviculture ==
Aviculture

- Falconry
  - Day-old cockerel
  - Falconry (training)
  - Lure (falconry)
  - Takagari
- Pigeon racing
- Pinioning
- War pigeon
  - Cher Ami
  - Commando (pigeon)
  - G. I. Joe (pigeon)
  - Paddy (pigeon)
  - William of Orange (pigeon)
- Wing clipping

== Bird diseases and parasites ==
- Aspergillosis
- Avian influenza
- Avian malaria
- Bird louse
- Feather mite
- Psittacosis

== Threats and conservation ==
- Avicide
- Bird conservation
  - Bird sanctuary
  - Bird conservation groups
    - Bird Protection Quebec
    - BirdLife International
    - Fundación ProAves
    - National Audubon Society
    - Royal Society for the Protection of Birds
  - Important bird areas
- Bird control
  - Bird control spike
  - Bird netting
  - Bird scarer
  - Goose egg addling
  - Scarecrow
- Bird strike
- Towerkill

== Persons influential in the field of birds ==
=== Artists ===
- James Audubon
- Lars Jonsson
- David Allen Sibley

=== Ornithologists ===
List of ornithologists

- John Gould
- James Clements
- James Audubon
- Chris Mead
- Killian Mullarney
- Roger Tory Peterson
- Pamela C. Rasmussen
- Alexander Skutch
- David Snow
- Alexander Wilson

=== Writers ===
- Mark Cocker
- Pete Dunne

== Birds in culture ==
- Featherwork
- Quill

== See also ==
- Dinosaur
- Outline of dinosaurs
