= Outline of dinosaurs =

Overview of and topical guide to dinosaurs

The following outline is provided as an overview of and topical guide to dinosaurs:

Dinosaurs – diverse group of animals of the clade and superorder Dinosauria. They were the dominant terrestrial vertebrates for over 160 million years, from the late Triassic period (about in 1963) until the end of the Cretaceous (2000), when the Cretaceous–Paleogene extinction event led to the extinction of all non-avian dinosaurs at the close of the Mesozoic era.

Birds evolved within theropod dinosaurs during the Jurassic period. Some survived the Cretaceous–Paleogene extinction event, including the ancestors of all modern birds, and birds are the only dinosaurs which survived to the present day. The outline of birds covers these avian dinosaurs.

== Types of dinosaurs ==
- Feathered dinosaur

=== By period ===
- Paleocene dinosaurs

=== By region ===
- List of African dinosaurs
- List of Asian dinosaurs
- Australian and Antarctic dinosaurs
  - List of Australian and Antarctic dinosaurs
  - South Polar dinosaurs
  - Dinosaurs of New Zealand
- List of European dinosaurs
- List of Indian and Madagascan dinosaurs
- List of North American dinosaurs
  - List of Appalachian dinosaurs
- List of South American dinosaurs

== Dinosaur fossils ==
- Fossil
- Ichnotaxon
  - Ichnites
  - List of dinosaur ichnogenera
  - Lists of dinosaur specimens
  - List of stratigraphic units with dinosaur tracks
- List of dinosaur-bearing rock formations
- List of stratigraphic units with dinosaur body fossils
- List of stratigraphic units with dinosaur trace fossils
- List of stratigraphic units with few dinosaur genera
- List of stratigraphic units with indeterminate dinosaur fossils

== Fields that study dinosaurs ==
- Vertebrate paleontology
- Phylogenetics

== History of dinosaurs ==
- Evolution of dinosaurs –
- History of paleontology – history of the study of the fossil record.
  - Dinosaur renaissance – a period of renewed interest in dinosaurs, and a shift in the scientific consensus about them.
- Prehistoric reptiles – broad category that is intended to help distinguish the dinosaurs from other prehistoric reptiles. Dinosaurs, because of their long and successful reign for many millions of years, are almost exclusively dealt with in their own category of prehistoric life. Therefore, this category covers all the non-dinosaurian reptiles which are often erroneously considered to be dinosaurs, such as the seafaring varieties of plesiosaurs and the flying pterosaurs.

== Biology of dinosaurs ==
- Age determination in dinosaurs
- Dinosaur coloration
- Dinosaur intelligence
- Physiology of dinosaurs
- Dinosaur reproduction
  - Dinosaur egg
  - Dinosaur senses
    - Dinosaur vision

=== Dinosaur anatomy ===
- Antorbital fenestra
- Arctometatarsal
- Armour (anatomy)
- Claw
- Club (anatomy)
- Coracoid tubercle
- Crop (anatomy)
- Epoccipital
- Furcula
- Gastralium
- Gizzard
- Horn (anatomy)
- Infratemporal fenestra
- Interdental plate
- Manus (anatomy)
- Neck frill
- Obturator process
- Osteoderm
- Palpebral (bone)
- Pes (anatomy)
- Predentary
- Proximodorsal process
- Rostral bone
- Scleral ring
- Scute
- Synsacrum
- Thagomizer

== Dinosaur psychology ==
- Dinosaur behavior
- Dinosaur intelligence

== Dinosaur resources ==
- Album of Dinosaurs (book)
- Walking with Dinosaurs (documentary)

== Dinosaurs in culture ==
- Cultural depictions of dinosaurs
- Dinosaurs in popular media
  - Fictional dinosaurs
  - Barney & Friends
- Living dinosaur
- List of dinosaur parks
- List of U.S. state dinosaurs
- Sites of fossilized dinosaurs across the southern South Korean coast

=== Animals commonly mistaken as dinosaurs ===
- Pterosaurs (also known as pterodactyls))
- Extinct marine reptiles, such as:
  - Ichthyosaurs
  - Plesiosaurs
  - Mosasaurs

== Persons influential in dinosaurs ==
- List of paleontologists

== See also ==
- Outline of birds
