= Bird tracks =

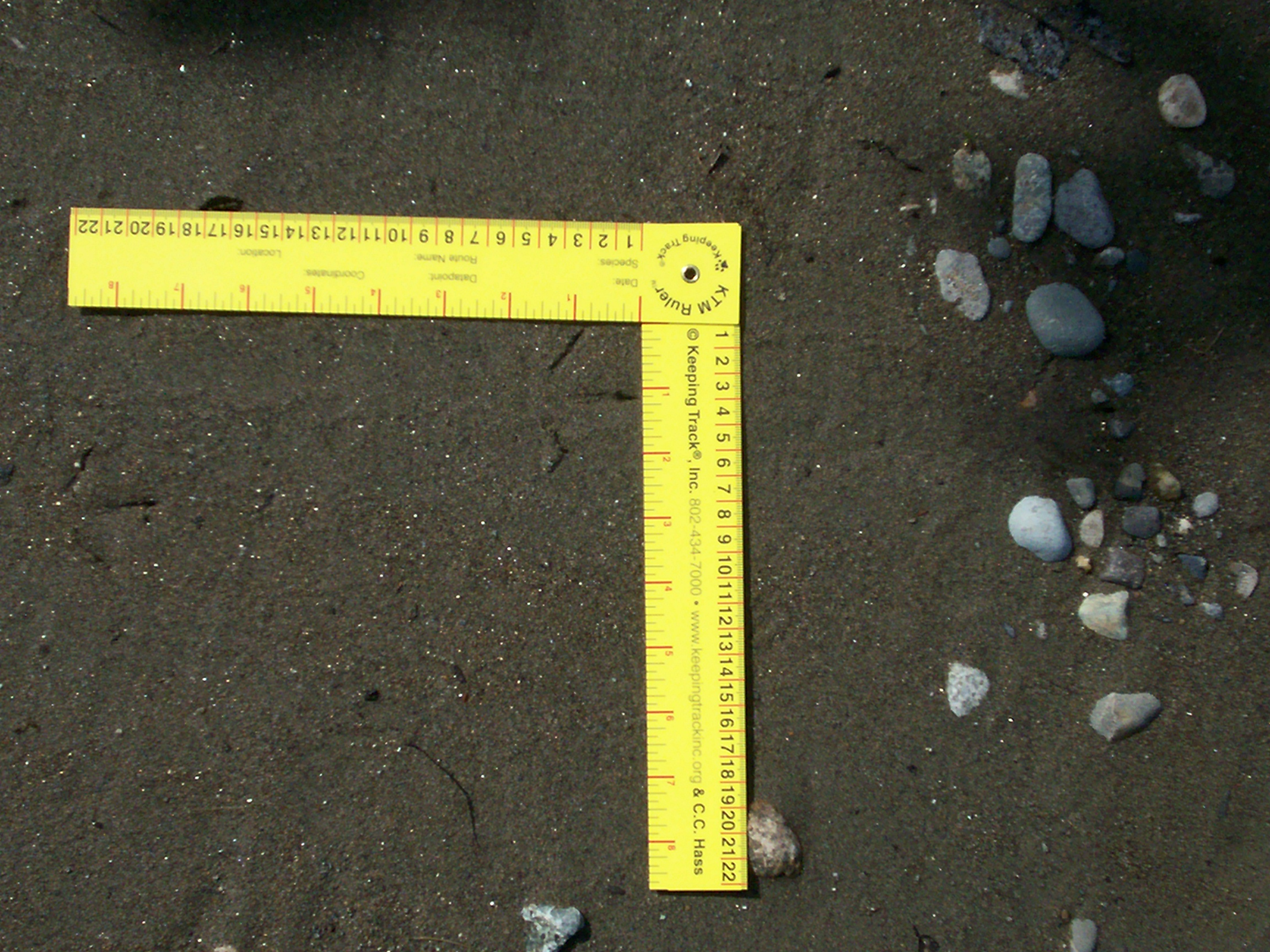
Tracks of the greater yellowlegs

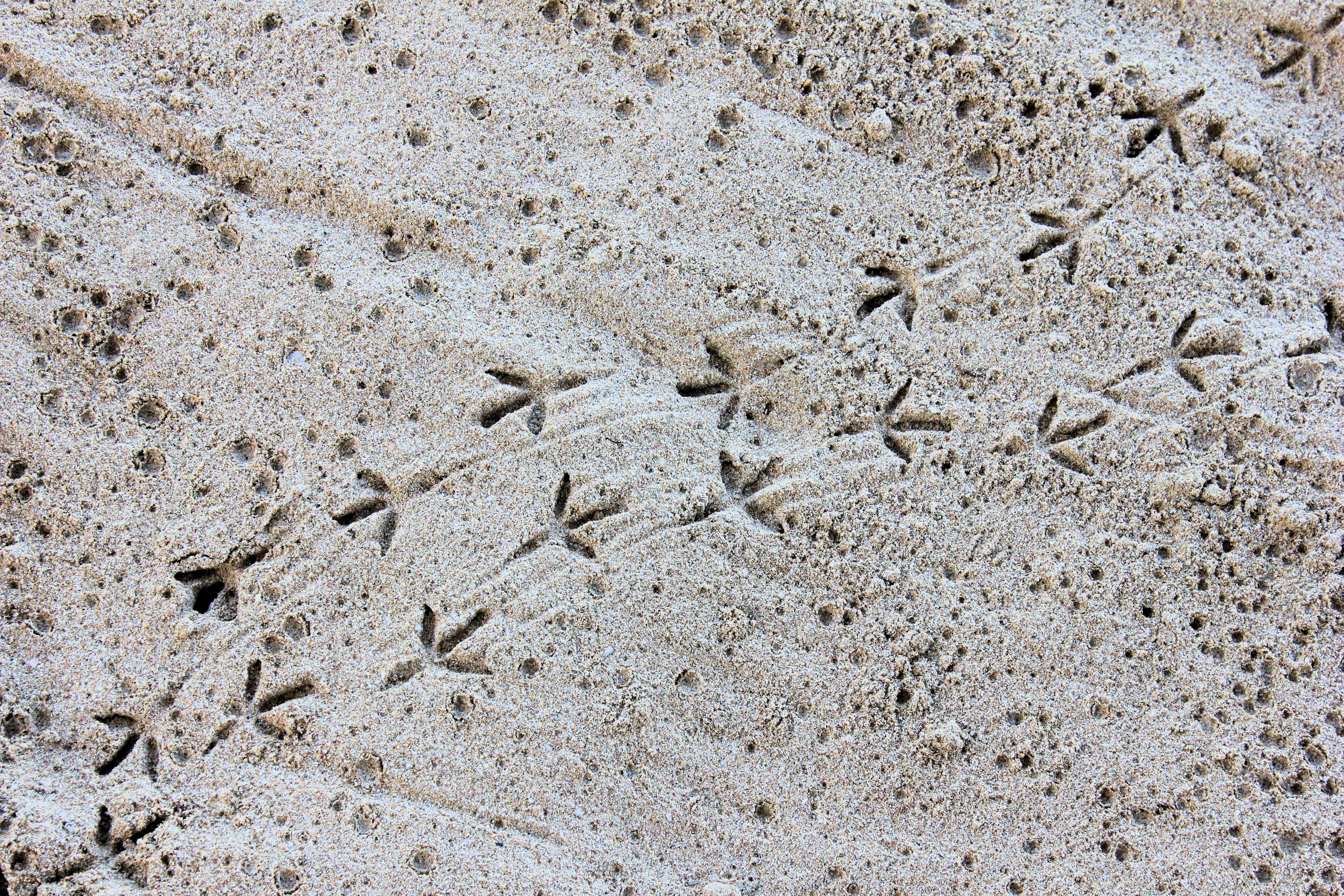
Wader tracks from a beach in Costa Rica.

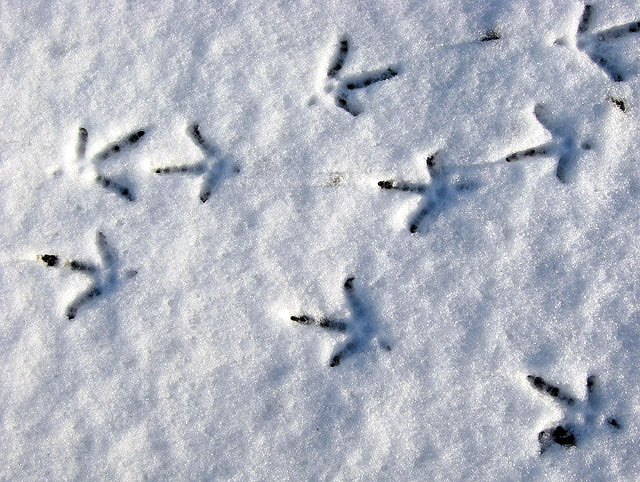
Tracks of the common pheasant (Phasianus colchicus)

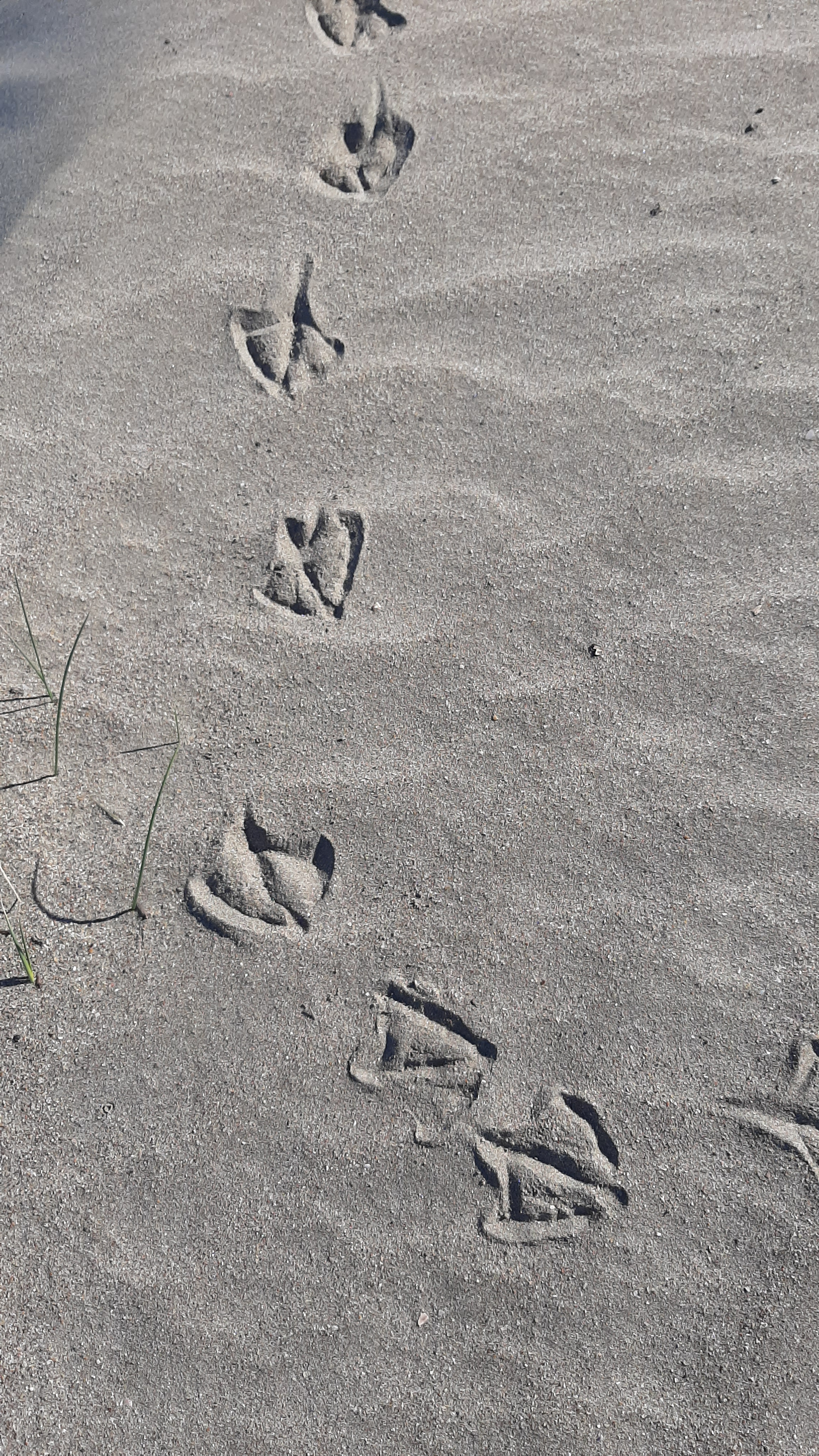
Tracks of an Anseriform with webbed feet evident

Bird tracking provides a way to assess the habitat range and behavior of birds without ever seeing the bird. Bird tracking falls under the category of tracking and is related to animal tracking. Bird tracking field guides may be used by trackers. Bird tracking is a tool used by naturalists to assess what birds are present in an ecosystem even if the bird is rarely seen.

== Tracks ==
Feet

A bird can be identified using the number and position of toes in the track.

- Zygodactyl feet, like those of woodpeckers, owls, parrots and roadrunners, have two toes in the front and two toes in the back. These feet allow tree-dwelling birds to walk up trees and grip branches, and, in the case of the roadrunner, make running on the ground faster.
- Ansiodactyl feet are the most common foot type, found in three-quarters of the world's birds. They have three toes in the front and one toe in the back, which are helpful for grasping onto small branches. In galliformes (such as pheasants or grouse), the back toe may not show up in the track, as it is very small.
- Pamprodactyl feet are found in swifts and mousebirds. All four toes point forward.

Besides toes, other factors affect the shape of a bird's feet. Turkey vulture feet lack the talons of most other birds of prey because they scavenge carrion instead of hunting live prey, and thus their feet are less for grabbing and more for enabling a soft landing. This causes them to awkwardly hop on the ground. Water birds, such as ducks, geese, boobies and cormorants all have webbed feet that enable swimming. These feet can be identified by the outline that stretches across the toes.

Pattern classification

The pattern of the tracks can also tell the observer what species was present. Some birds hop on the ground while foraging, and their tracks will be in pairs, with the feet next to each other. Single prints that are spaced out indicate a walking bird, while the tracks of a running bird will be spaced even farther apart.

Environment

The visibility of tracks depends on the bird's environment. Common sense can be used to rule out certain birds from an area; for example, a tropical bird will likely not be in the snow. A bird's habitat may also affect its locomotion. For example, most sparrows hop while foraging, but grassland sparrow species (like the savannah sparrow) walk instead, only hopping or running if their prey is getting away.

== Spoors ==
Aside from tracks, birds also leave behind other spoors that can be used to determine their presence. Droppings are one such spoor. Wild turkey droppings are notable in that they can determine the sex of the bird; a male turkey's will be shaped like the letter J, and a female turkey's will be spiral-shaped. Other avian spoors include peck marks and the remnants of dust baths.

== Conservation ==
Data collection

In the Pacific Northwest of the United States, a program called NatureMapping collects data by educating the public and having them pool their data in a citizen science application. Data can be collected in the field using a handheld palm pilot and GPS system that streamlines the collection process. This free program is called CyberTracker. In order to make sure that data is reliable, a tracker evaluation system has been put in place through the CyberTracker organization.

== Fossilized bird tracks ==
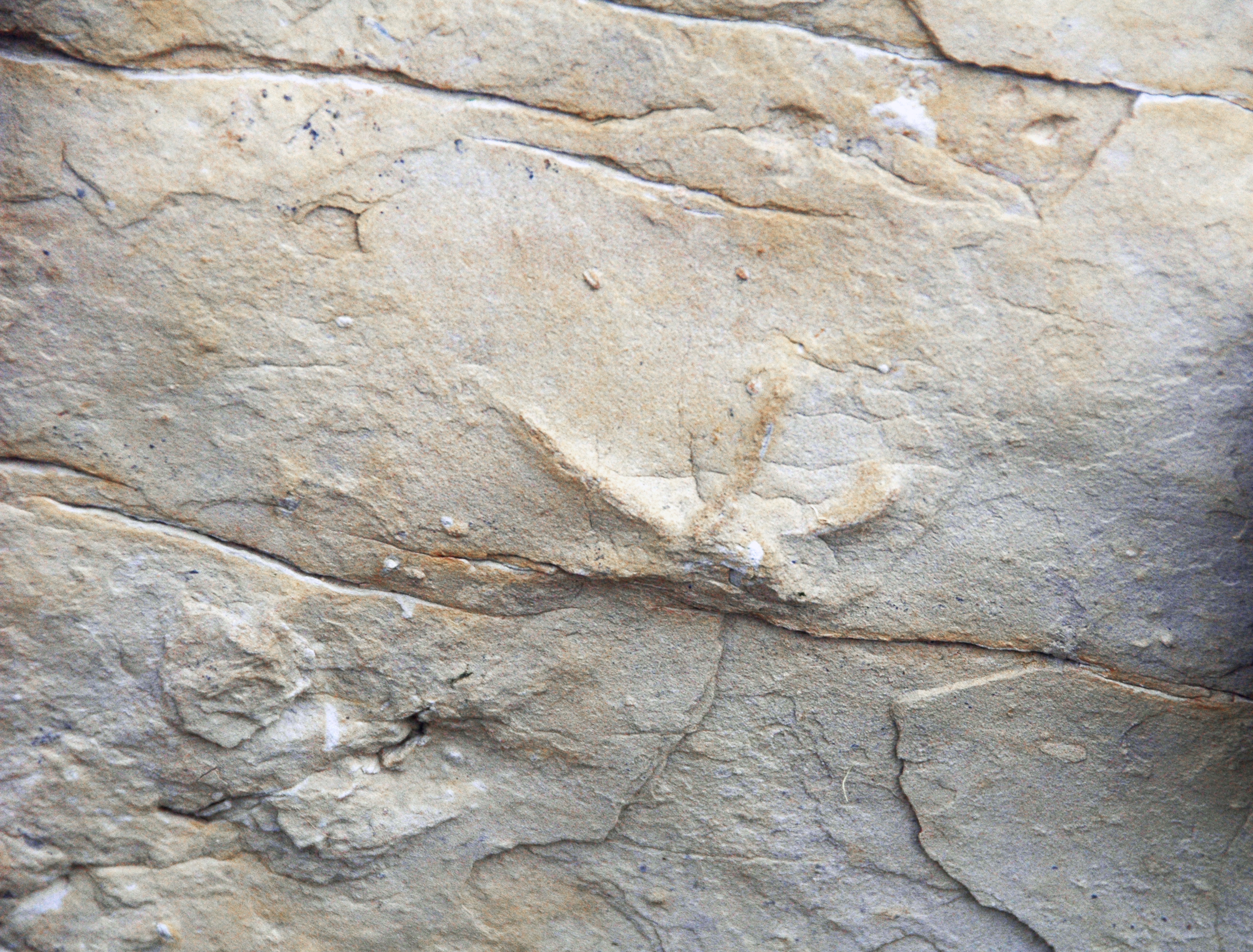
Cretaceous period fossil bird track in the Lararmie Formation near Golden, Colorado

Fossilized tracks from prehistoric birds exist. Tracks dating as far back as the Early Cretaceous have been found in Wonthaggi Formation, which, at the time the tracks were made, would have been part of Gondwanaland. Fossil tracks may be used to determine the locomotion of extinct species. Modern-day bird tracks are also useful to paleontologists, as they can be compared to those of dinosaurs. Tracks of three-toed bipedal dinosaurs, found in the Elliot Formation and dated to the Early Jurassic, were compared to those of small birds.

Spoors have also been fossilized. Researchers have used them to draw comparisons between the behaviors of prehistoric and extant birds. Some researchers, for example, have suggested using prehistoric dust bath remnants to determine convergent behavioral traits in birds of different families.

== See also ==
- Bird feet and legs
- Dactyly
- Neoichnology
