= Anting (behavior) =

Avian maintenance behavior

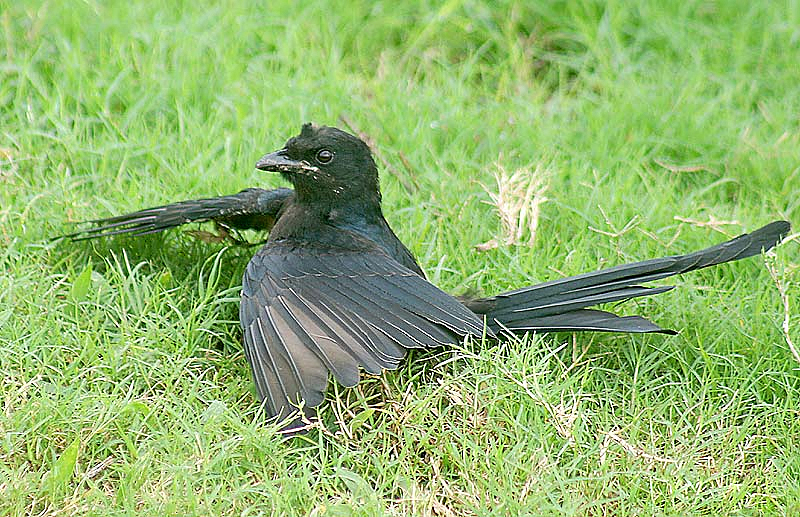
A black drongo in a typical anting posture

Anting is a maintenance behavior during which birds rub insects, usually ants, on their feathers and skin. A bird may hold a single ant in its beak to rub over the body, or lie in an area of high insect density and wallow as when dust bathing. Ants secrete chemicals like formic acid to aid in their defense against bacteria and parasites. It has been hypothesized that formic acid may help birds avoid similar ailments by acting as a deterrent. Alternatively, anting could make the insects edible by removing the distasteful acid, or possibly supplement the bird's own preen oil. More than 200 species of bird are known to participate in this behaviour. Anting may have a similar function to the mammalian behaviour of self-anointing.

== History ==
The first scientific writings of this behaviour dates back to 1831. American ornithologist John James Audubon described wild juvenile turkeys that appeared to wallow in abandoned ant hills. Another description was published by a naturalist in 1847 in a manuscript called "Bird of Jamaica". In it the author describes how ants remove parasites from a tame crow, while the crow is foraging for food. In 1934 Alexander Hugh Chisholm described in Bird Wonders of Australia a strange relationship birds had with ants. The behaviour was described by Erwin Stresemann in German as Einemsen in the German ornithology journal Ornithologische Monatsberichte (Volume XLIII, p. 138) in 1935. Indian ornithologist Salim Ali interpreted an observation by his cousin Humayun Abdulali in the 1936 volume of Journal of the Bombay Natural History Society and included a reference to the Stresemann's paper suggesting that the German term could be translated into English as "anting".

== Modes ==
=== Active anting ===
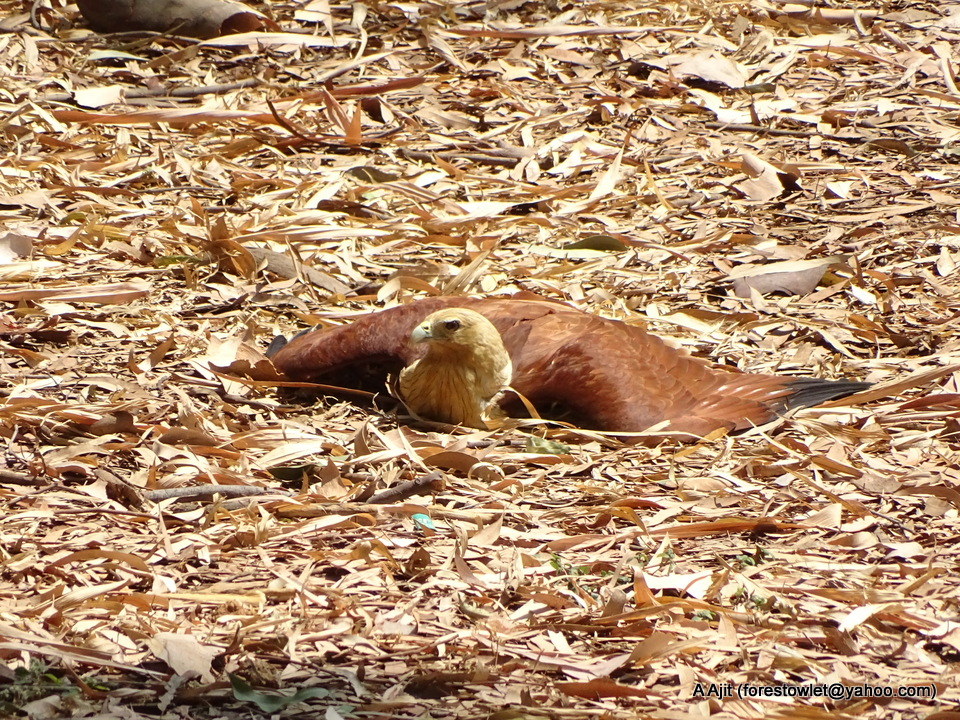
A brahminy kite anting at lalbagh Botanical Garden in Bangalore, India

Anting most commonly occurs on the ground, with some species preferring tree branches. A bird will seize an ant with the beak and proceed to rub it over the feathers. However, there are some cases where an ant is used more than once but never exceeds three uses. There are some exceptions to this as starlings often take a ball of ants in their bills to be used for anting. Active anting happens very quickly and can often be mistaken for regular feather maintenance. This type of anting can last anywhere from just several minutes to half an hour. Most species of birds practice active anting and do this individually or in small groups. Birds may also use 'substitutes' to ants, such as snails, grasshoppers, amphipods and even larvae.

=== Passive anting ===
Passive anting is the practice of allowing ants to crawl freely across the body. The wings and tail are spread as flat as possible, allowing contact with the ground. Birds will typically shake ants from the head and neck. This type of anting is less common and is mostly seen in robins and ravens.

== Functions ==
=== Ridding of ectoparasites ===
Anting to get rid of ectoparasites is one hypothesis for anting in songbirds. This hypothesis suggests that birds use the chemical secretions that come from ants to control and get rid of parasites in their feathers. Microorganisms such as bacteria and fungi can destroy a bird's feathers if their numbers become large enough. Formic acid is a commonly produced chemical by ants, and it was found to inhibit growth of feather-destroying microorganisms. However, there is little evidence that chemicals from ants help to remove or deter other parasites such as feather lice and mites.

=== Feather grooming ===
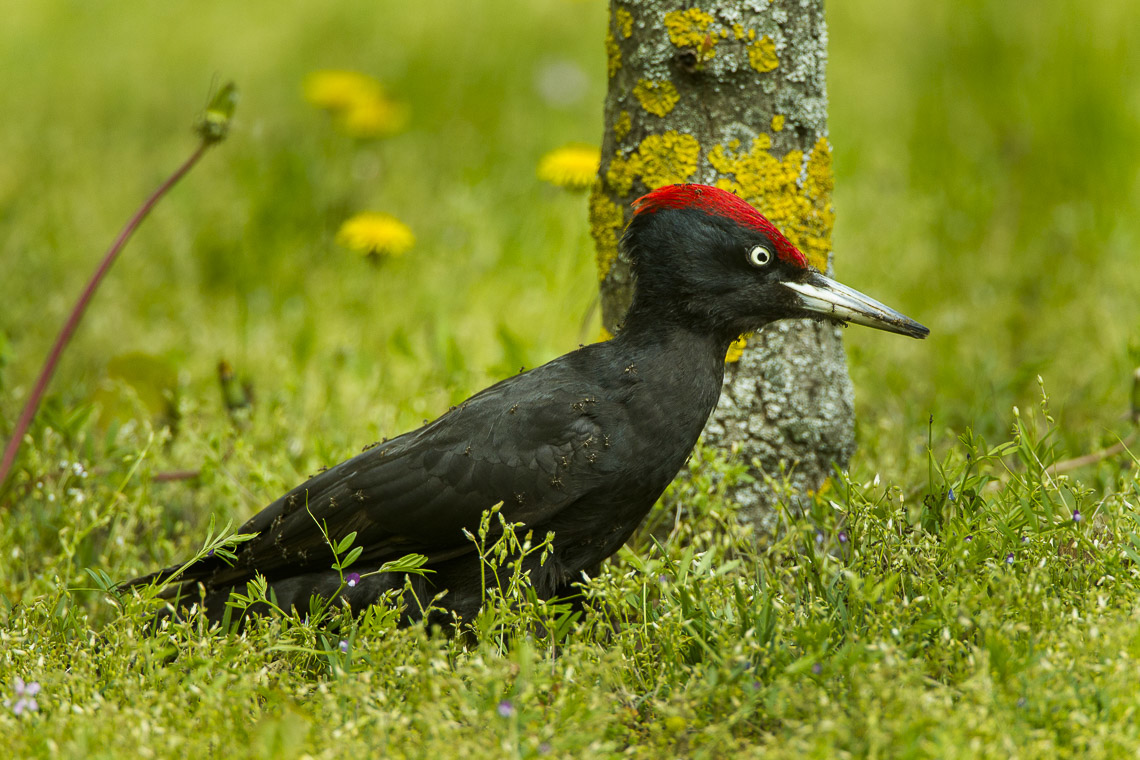
A Black woodpecker anting in Hungary

The hypothesis that anting is a form of feather maintenance suggests that anting brings saliva to the bird's feathers for use in preening. This helps to remove old preen oil and other substances.

=== Food preparation ===
The food preparation hypothesis suggests that birds rub the ant in its feathers to remove a substance on the ant. Ants produce formic acid as an anti-predator adaptation. Thus, when an ant feels threatened, as when in the beak of a bird, it will spray formic acid. It is suggested that birds then rub the ants in their feathers to remove the harmful formic acid. The bird will then ingest the ant. This can be seen in European starlings, Sturnus vulgaris.

=== Sensory self-stimulation ===
Anting has been compared to human activities such as smoking and other external stimuli that serve no biological purpose and are just for self-stimulation. This hypothesis has been suggested as anting has no obvious function; it is non-adaptive. Birds are said to achieve pleasure from anting, and anting has characteristics of a habit. However, there is no definitive evidence that sensory self-stimulation is the purpose of anting in birds. There have been several studies that claim to prove this hypothesis while others say the opposite.

=== Functions in molt ===
It has been found that passerine birds molt in the summer months. These birds often focus much of the anting on their wings and tails. This is where the largest feathers emerge, and it has been suggested that anting helps stimulate the growth of these feathers during molt. Not all birds that ant do so during molt.

== Species of ants used ==
Ants that spray and produce formic acid for defense are used for anting more often than species which do not spray or produce formic acid. Species from the subfamily Formicinae are the most commonly chosen by birds. Species from Dolichoderinae and Myrmicinae subfamilies are also used for anting, but not as commonly as Formicinae. If given a choice a bird will choose an ant in the subfamily Formicinae over all other species. In total there are 24 ant species birds use for anting.

== Substitutes of ants ==
Some birds participate in similar behaviour with other organisms, such as garlic snails, amphipods, millipedes, dermapterans, caterpillars, grasshoppers, hemipterans, mealworm larvae, and wasps.

== Related behaviours ==
Dusting with soil from ant-hills has been considered by some as equivalent to anting.

Some birds like antbirds and flickers not only ant, but also consume the ants as an important part of their diet. Other opportunist ant-eating birds include sparrows, wrens, grouse, and starlings. European honey-buzzards have been found to gather fresh maple branches on the ground and then spread themselves over it and it has been suggested that this might be a case of tool-use to attract ants for anting.

Similar to anting may be the observed habit some birds show of picking up cigarette butts, sometimes lit, and rubbing themselves with them.
