= Dinosaur vision =

Study of dinosaur visual acuity

Dinosaur vision was, in general, better than the vision of most other reptiles, although vision varied between dinosaur species. Coelurosaurs, for example, had good stereoscopic or binocular vision, whereas large carnosaurs had poor binocular vision, comparable to that of modern alligators. Recent evidence has also shown that some species possessed highly specialized color and night vision.

== Theropoda ==
=== Allosauroidea ===
Allosauroids, including Carcharodontosaurus and Allosaurus, did not have very good binocular vision, comparable to modern crocodiles. They possessed binocular vision which was restricted to a region only 20° wide, which is understandable, as they hunted mostly large and slow prey. Their keenest sense was most likely smell.

=== Deinonychosauria ===
The binocular vision of deinonychosaurs, such as Velociraptor and Stenonychosaurus was better than that of allosauroids and it matched or exceeded that of extant predatory birds. Their binocular field was up to 60°.

=== Tyrannosauridae ===
The position of the eyes of tyrannosaurids suggests that they had a very well developed sense of vision. Combined with the shape of the head they had better binocular vision than allosauroids. The eye position of Tyrannosaurus rex was similar to that of modern humans, but their eyes and optic lobe were much larger than that of modern humans. T. rex, unlike most dinosaurs, had a combination of powerful eyesight and a great sense of smell. The binocular vision of Daspletosaurus has been found to be less than that of Stenonychosaurus, but more than that of Gorgosaurus.

=== Ceratosauria ===
Ceratosaurs had eyes placed closer to the side. This widened their field of vision, but decreased their depth perception.

== Ornithischia ==
=== Pachycephalosauria ===
Pachycephalosaurs, like most of the plant-eaters, had eyes on the sides of the head, so they could quickly spot approaching predators. They also had better depth perception than most other dinosaurs.

== Night vision ==
This area of research has focused on whether certain species of dinosaur possessed acute night vision, or if such nocturnal adaptations were exclusive to smaller mammals and later, birds. Computed tomography has revealed evidence suggesting that several dinosaur species possessed formidable night vision and were capable of extensive nocturnal activity.

The scleral ring is critical in determining a dinosaur's nocturnal capacity. Diameter and circumference of the structure directly correlate with the effectiveness of modern animal night vision and is hypothesized to do the same in dinosaurs. A larger scleral ring indicates an increased capacity to capture ambient light, thereby amplifying nocturnal visual acuity.

Small herbivores, such as the Shuvuuia deserti, were found to have particularly large scleral rings. Taken in tandem with previous findings of extremely sensitive hearing, researchers concluded that they likely possessed acute night vision for nocturnal activity.

== Color vision ==
Dinosaur color vision is studied by evaluating fossil records and reconstructing biomes; researchers can make inferences about the biological structures that are needed to interact with a dinosaur's hypothesized environment.

Melanosomes have been identified in the fossilized feathers of certain dinosaur species. The presence of melanosomes in bird feathers indicates the potential for enhanced color discrimination. Modern birds whose feathers contain melanosome-like structures are tetrachromats. Tetrachromacy refers to the possession of four types of cone cells in the eyes, allowing for enhanced color vision.

Because melanosomes are associated with enhanced color vision in birds today, the presence of these structures in early dinosaurs suggests that they may have also been tetrachromats. This hypothesis implies that these dinosaurs had advanced color vision, potentially aiding them in tasks such as finding food, identifying mates, and communicating with conspecifics. Specifically, these tetrachromats are capable of discriminating shades of turquoise and ultraviolet that trichromats, like humans, cannot.
