= Neoichnology =

Neoichnology (Greek néos „new“, íchnos „footprint“, logos „science“) is the science of footprints and traces of extant animals. Thus, it is a counterpart to paleoichnology, which investigates tracks and traces of fossil animals. Neoichnological methods are used in order to study the locomotion and the resulting tracks of both invertebrates and vertebrates. Often these methods are applied in the field of palaeobiology to gain a deeper understanding of fossilized footprints.

== Neoichnological methods ==
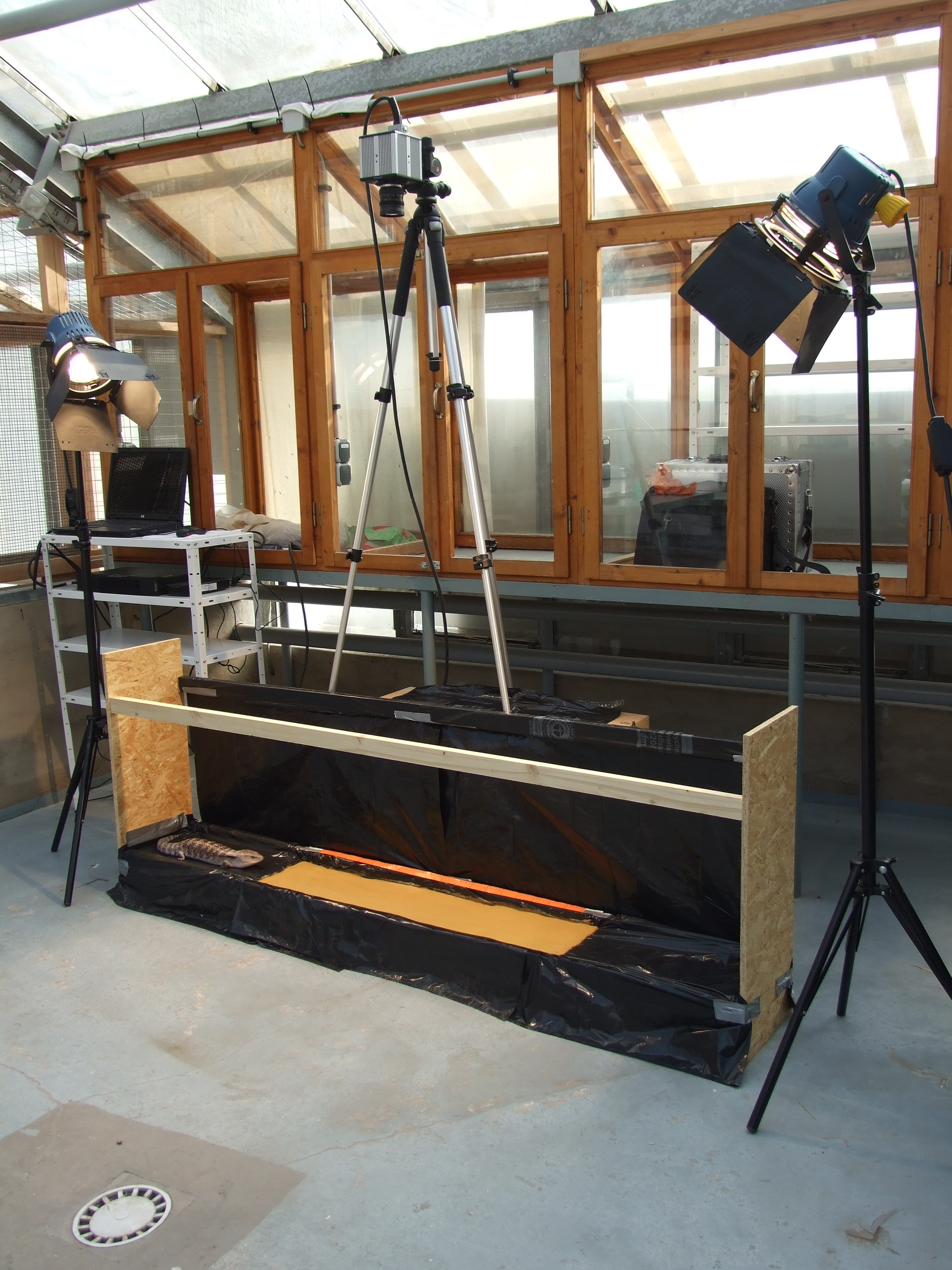
Experimental setup for a neoichnological study working with living animals

=== Working with living animals ===
Typically, when working with living animals, a race track is prepared and covered with a substrate, which allows for the production of footprints, i.e. sand of varying moisture content, clay or mud. After preparation, the animal is lured or shooed over the race track. This results in the production of numerous footprints that constitute a complete track. In some cases the animal is filmed during track production in order to subsequently study the impact of the animal's velocity or its behavior on the produced track. This poses an important advantage of working with living animals: changes in speed or direction, resting, slippage or moments of fright become visible in the produced tracks. After track production and prior to reuse, the track can be photographed, drawn or molded. Changes in the experimental setup are possible throughout the experiment, i. e. regulation of the moisture content of the substrate. As an alternative, also tracks of free living animals can be studied in nature (i.e. nearby lakes) and without any special experimental setup. However, without the standardized environment of the lab, matching the tracks with the behavior of the animal during track production is undoubtedly harder.

=== Working with foot models or severed limbs ===
Another field of methods is the experimental work done with foot models or severed limbs. With these methods, the natural behavior of the animal is excluded from the analysis. In a typical experimental setup, the prepared foot is pressed into the substrate of interest, which again allows for the production of a footprint. Other than in the methods previously mentioned, the experimenter has now the opportunity to regulate manually the pressure, direction and speed of foot touchdown. Because of that, the effects of those manipulations can be studied more directly. The layering of differently colored substrates furthermore allows to study the consequences of touchdown in lower substrate layers.
