= Plucking post =

Site used by a bird of prey

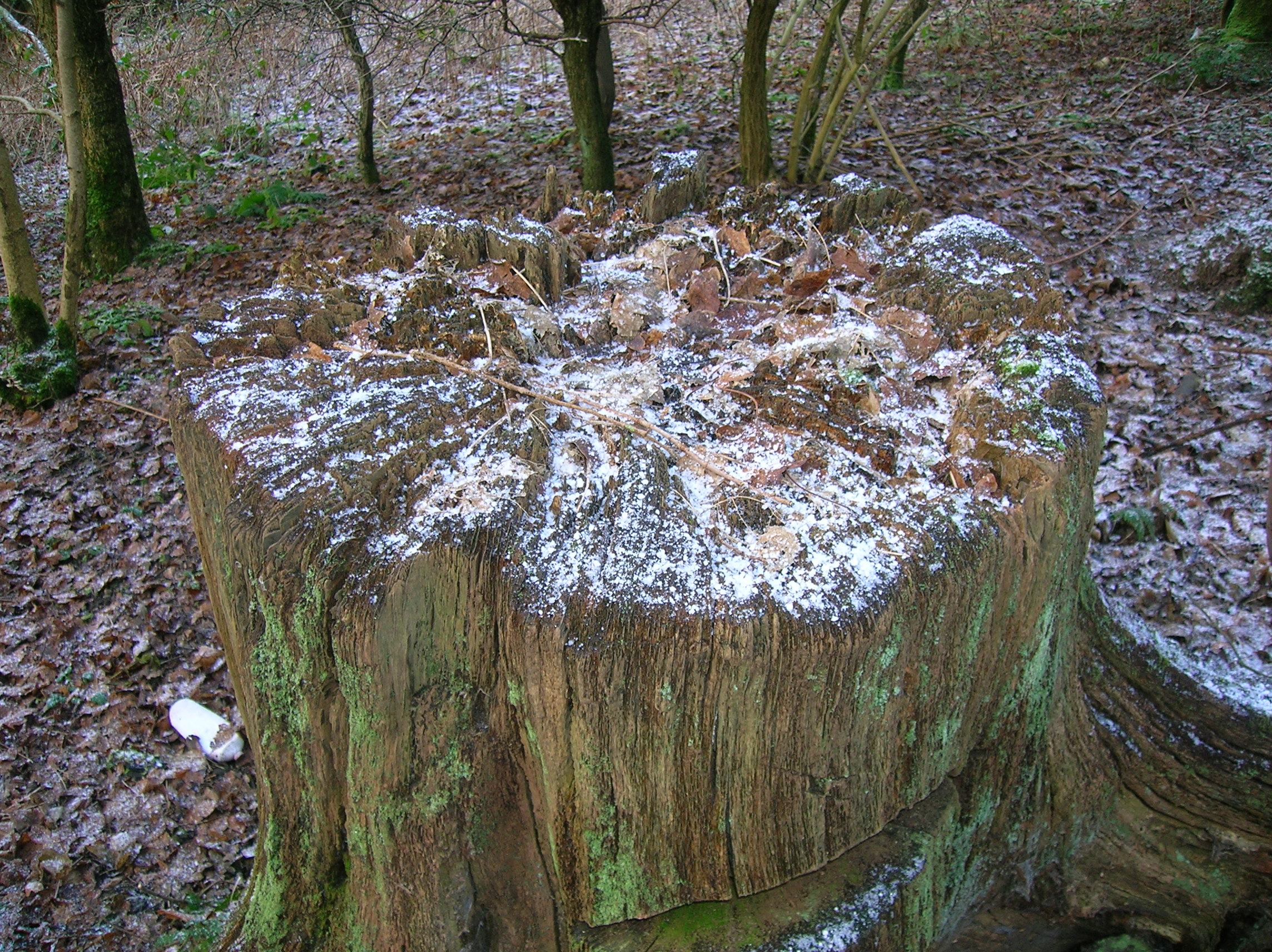
Substantial plucking post

A plucking post is a raised structure such as a tree stump which is used regularly by a bird of prey to dismember its prey, removing feathers and various other inedible parts before eating it.

== Purpose ==
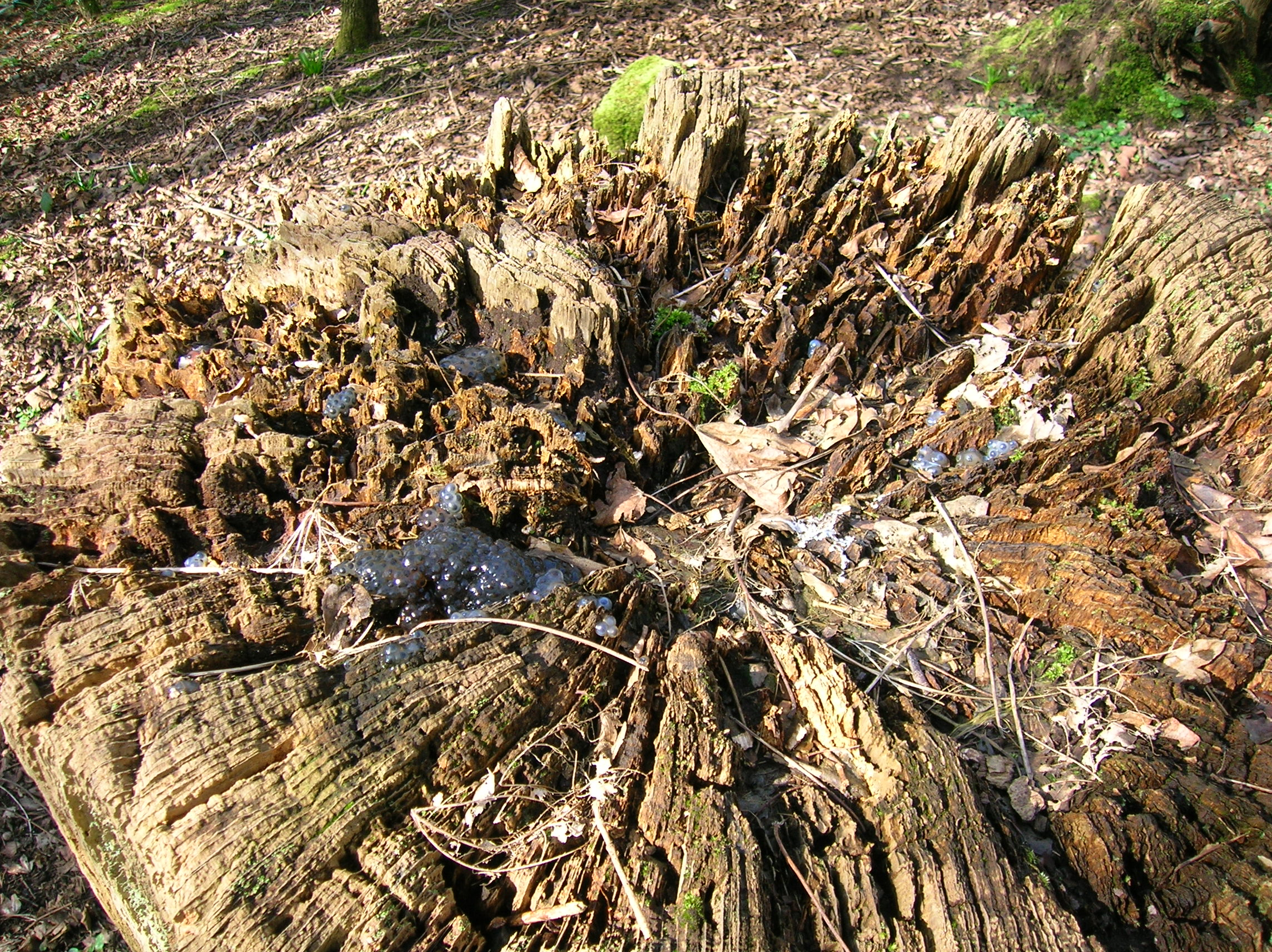
A relatively tall plucking post used here to dismember a toad and discard the spawn

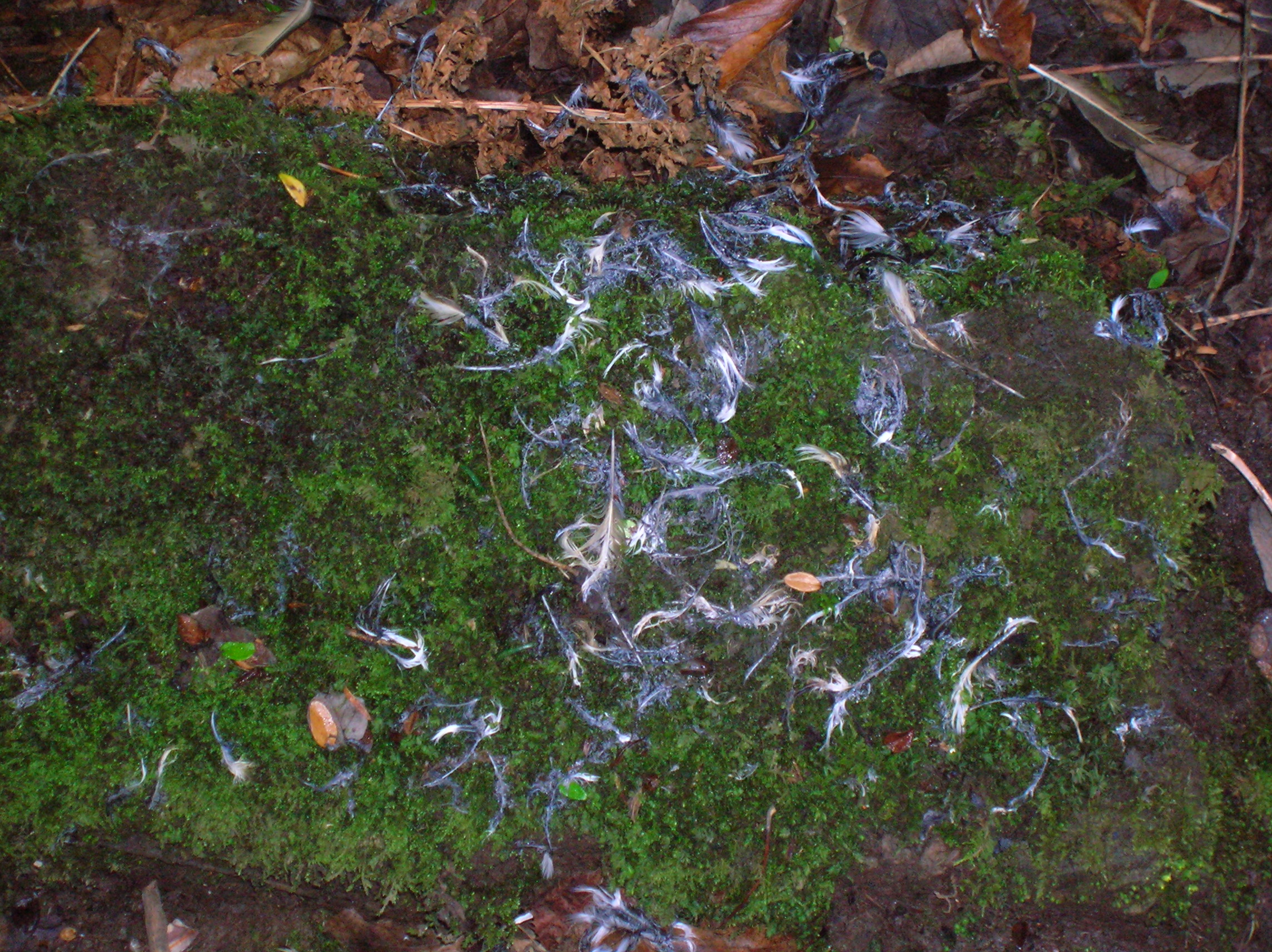
A low tree stump plucking post, used to pluck bird prey at Spier's school in Ayrshire

The elevated nature of the post allows for a safer landing with the heavy load of the prey, as well as being a good vantage point to scan for other predators, while the bird is vulnerable, involved in the relatively complex process of plucking and feeding on its prey.

Many owls use plucking posts for prey that has been caught on the ground. Barred owls often use old nests for the purpose. Plucking posts are used by barn owls which hunt by flying low and slowly over an area of open ground, hovering over spots that conceal potential prey. The barn owl feeds primarily on small vertebrates, particularly rodents. The common buzzard is another user of plucking posts and has an even more varied diet than the barn owl. The sparrowhawk flies low over the ground, skimming hedges and fences, but staying close to cover so that it can rapidly pounce on its victims. In woodland its agility enables it to fly swiftly between the trunks and branches.

In New Zealand the New Zealand falcon takes its catch to a plucking post to dislocate the bird's neck using the notch on its bill that all falcons have. It then plucks the feathers before eating the entire bird.

Plucking posts are ideal places for setting up bird hides, thus allowing close observation of birds of prey's feeding behaviour.

== Function ==
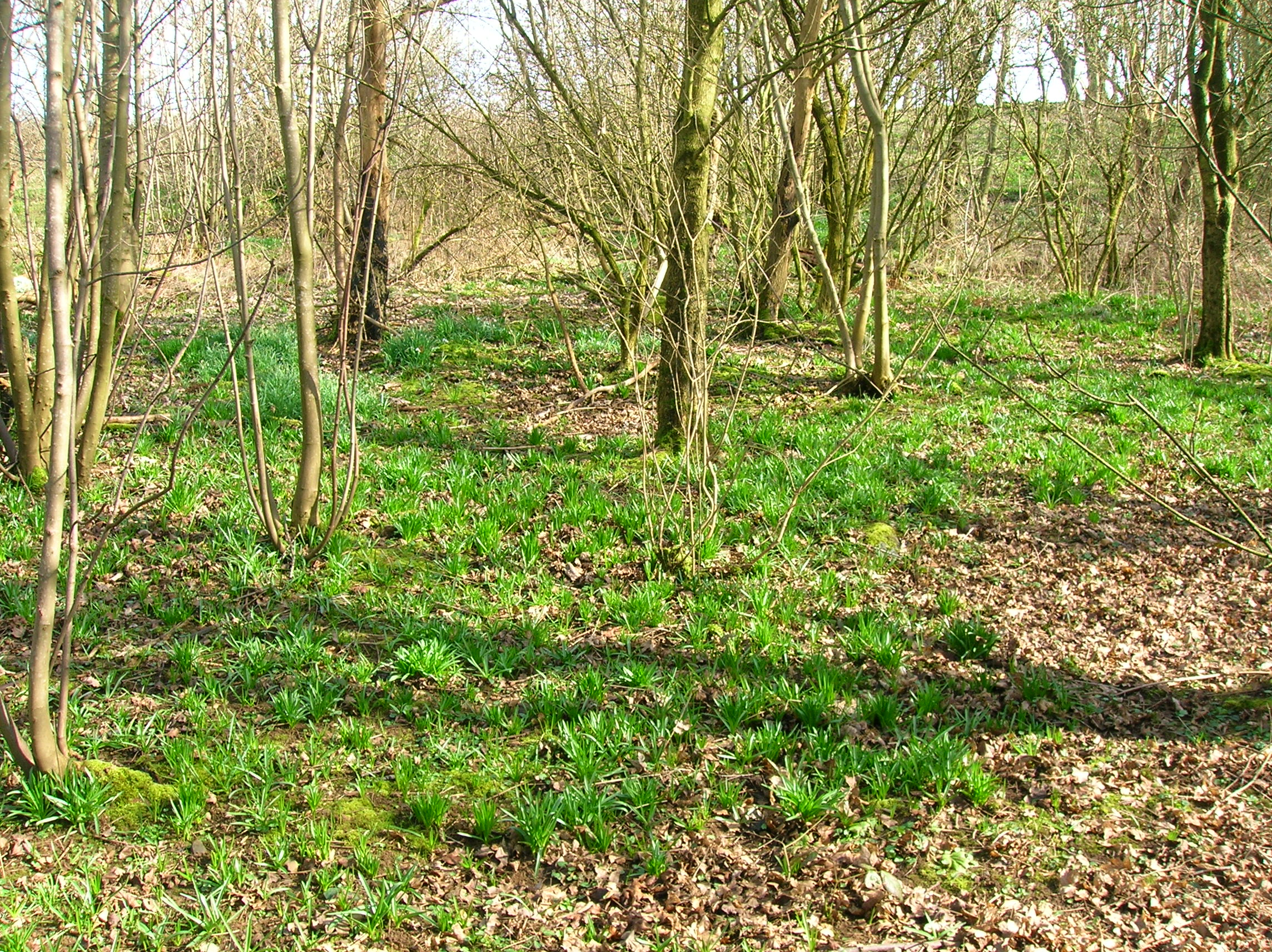
A view of a typical woodland site of a plucking post

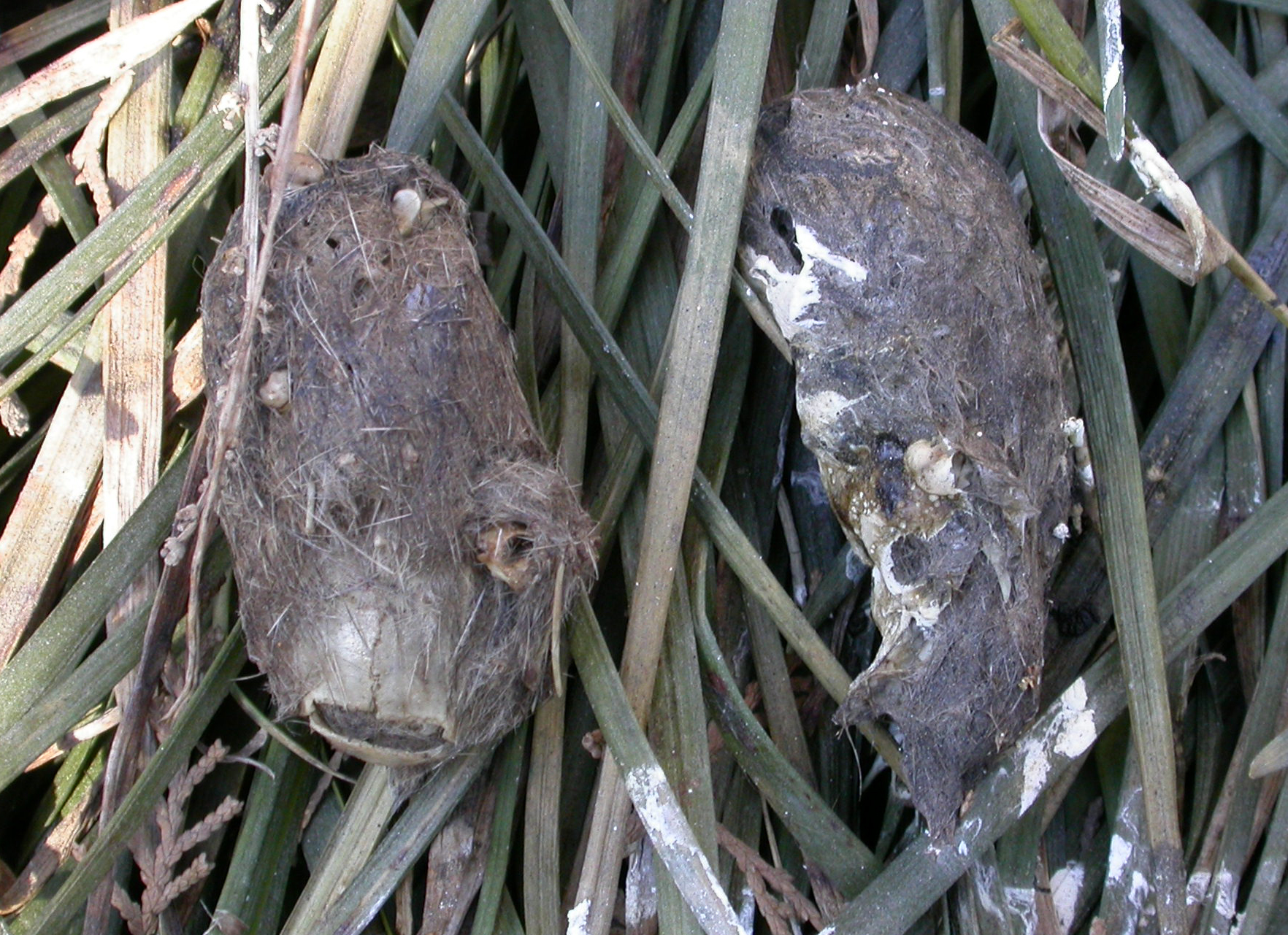
Pellets from a long-eared owl

The post provides a firm surface for an effective grip by the bird's talons and sometimes crevices for helping with the mechanical separation of the prey. Natural tree stumps and man-made structures such as straining and fence posts. Boulders may be used, especially if they have a carpet covering of moss or are cracked or ribbed.

Bird pellets are often found on or around plucking posts, composed of the indigestible items that were consumed by the predator.

Plucking posts, surrounded by feathers and fur, may indicate that a raptor nesting site is nearby and these may be mainly used during the breeding season.

Scientists can use the evidence of plucking posts to provide information about the feeding behaviour of relevant raptors.

It has also been suggested that faeces marks and plucking may represent a widespread method for communicating current reproduction and territory to conspecifics.

In secure or difficult surroundings the plucking post may be at ground level.

== Notes ==
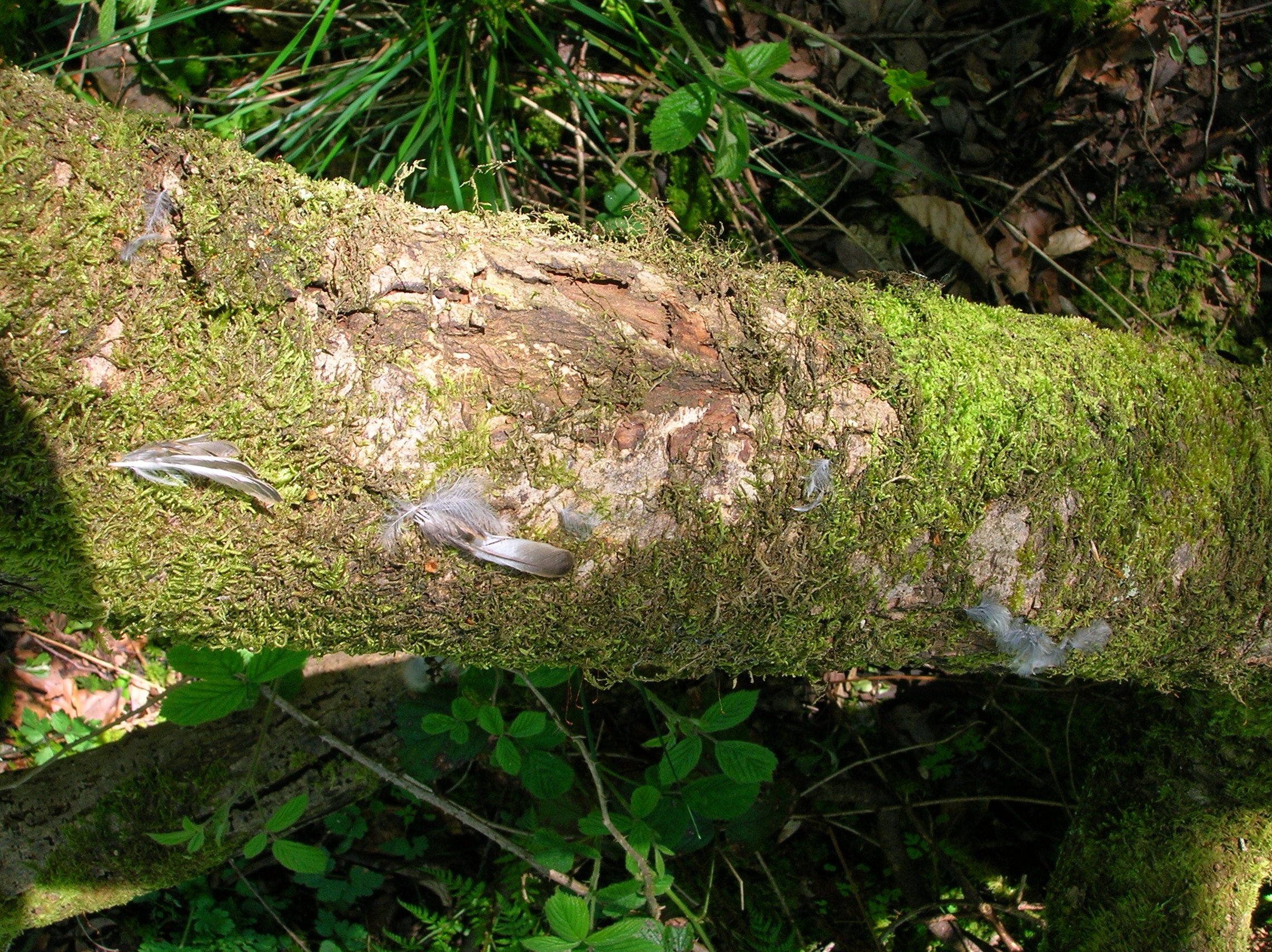
A plucking post on a log in old woodland

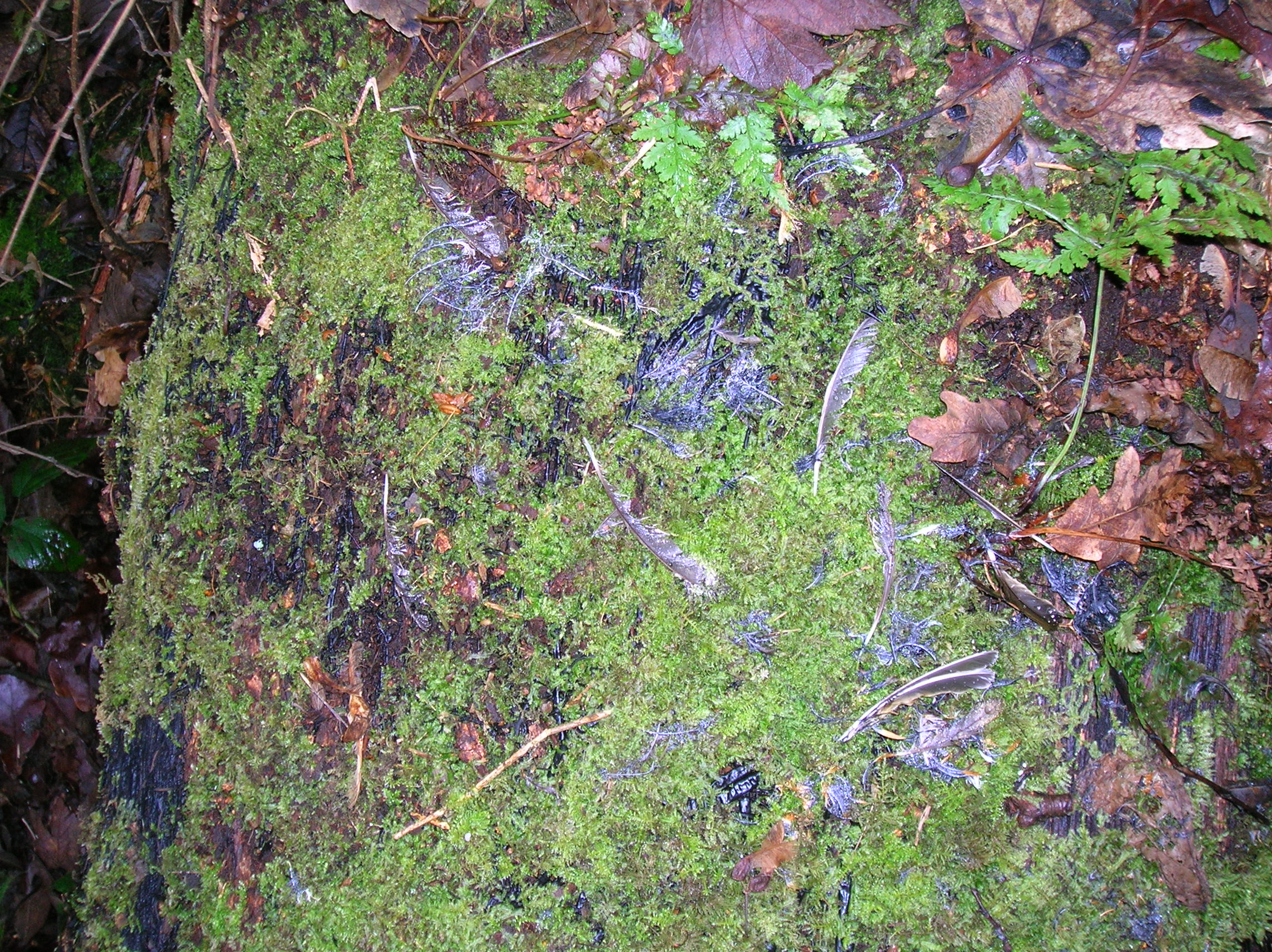
A plucking post in Crow Wood, Irvine, Scotland
