= Dinosaur senses =

Dinosaur senses are difficult subjects of study for paleontologists since soft tissue anatomy rarely fossilizes.

== Hearing and balance ==
=== Allosaurus ===
The three semicircular canals of the inner ear of Allosaurus fragilis, when viewed from the side, had a subtriangular outline. This subtriangular inner ear configuration is present in Carcharodontosaurus, lizards, turtles, but not in birds. The pointed apex "at the junction of the anterior and posterior semicircular canals" is caused by the near linearity of the canals and closely resembles the condition of modern crocodiles. The subtriangular configuration may be the basal condition of archosauromorphs.

=== Carcharodontosaurus saharicus ===
The three semicircular canals of the inner ear of Carcharodontosaurus saharicus, when viewed from the side, had a subtriangular outline. This subtriangular inner ear configuration is present in Allosaurus, lizards, turtles, but not in birds. The semi-"circular" canals themselves were actually very linear, which explains the pointed silhouette. In life, the floccular lobe of the brain would have projected into the area surrounded by the semicircular canals, just like in other non-avian theropods, birds, and pterosaurs.

The orientation of the lagena of C. saharicus resembles the condition in crocodilians and some birds. The extent of its perilymphatic duct resembled those of Varanus, crocodilians, and birds. The crista which would have supported the secondary tympanic membrane in C. saharicus was either absent, or not preserved.

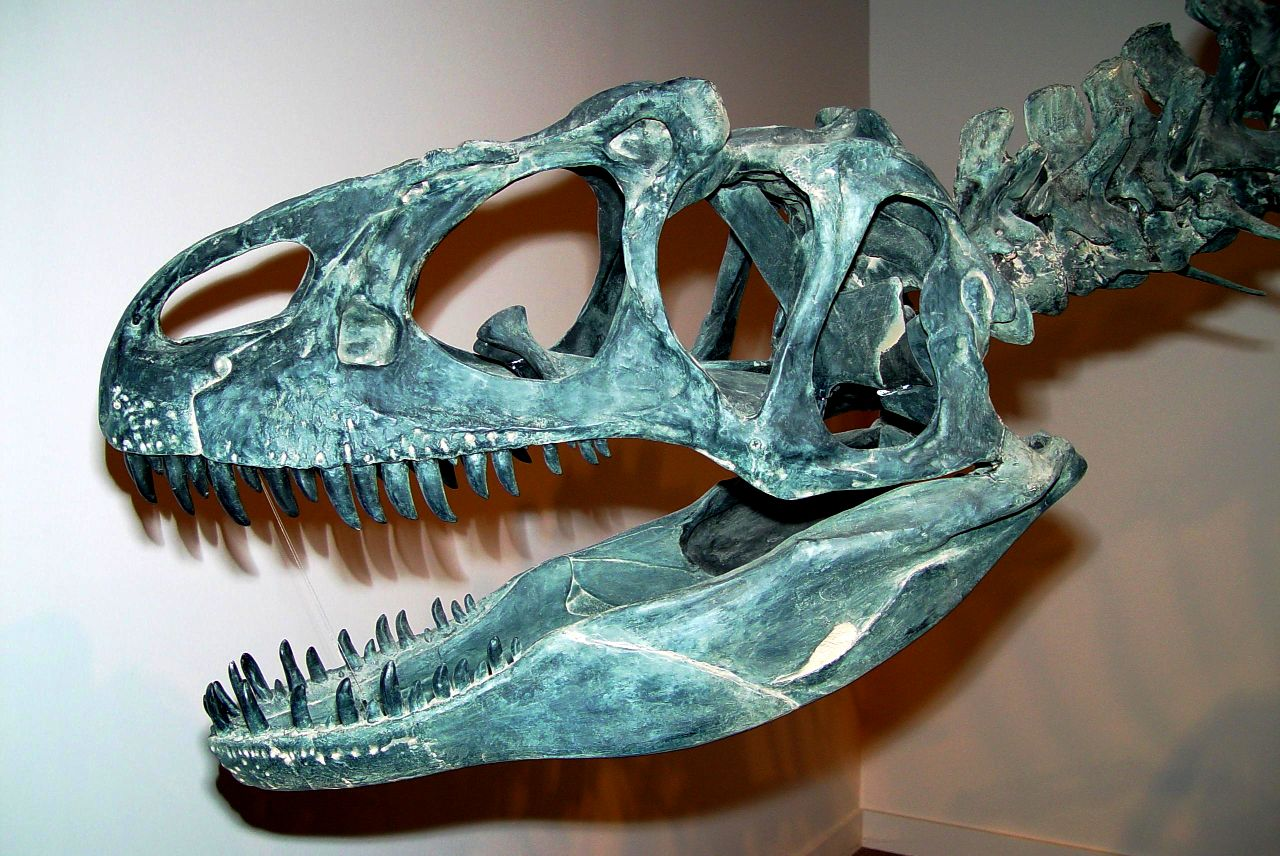
Allosaurus fragilis skull.

This contrasts with Troodon, whose crista were at least partially bony. The metotic strut of C. saharicus is smaller and located more closely to the midline of the animal's body than in non-avian maniraptors like Dromaeosaurus and Troodon, as well as primitive birds like Archaeopteryx and Hesperornis.

=== Theropods ===
Balance in theropods was aided by a vertebral column which was almost horizontal, placing the center of gravity near the hips. Tetanurans were named for their zygapophysis-stiffened tails to counterbalance long grasping claws. Deinonychosauria had elongated processes along the neural arches, which stiffened the tail and counterbalanced its long arms. Some theropods, like Tyrannosaurus rex, evolved very small arms relative to body size, which are thought, in part, to have allowed for increased head and jaw size. The middle ear cavity of troodontids and ornithomimosaurs was enlarged, suggesting sensitivity to low-frequency sounds.

=== Troodon ===
Troodon had crista supporting its tympanic membrane that were ossified at least in their dorsal and ventral regions and their remaining portions either cartilaginous or too delicate to be preserved. The metotic strut of Troodon was "laterally hypertrophied". This condition resembles that of Dromaeosaurus and primitive birds like Archaeopteryx and Hesperornis.

== Vision ==
=== Carcharodontosaurus ===
The optic nerve was large in Carcharodontosaurus.

=== Theropods ===
Among dinosaurs, theropods had exceptionally large eyes. Deinonychosaurians, especially troodontids, had forward-facing eyes, suggesting stereoscopic vision and improved depth perception. Tyrannosauroid snouts allowed for a 55˚ binocular field of view, less than a modern human but more than their hadrosaurid prey.

== See also ==
- Dinosaur brains and intelligence
- Dinosaur behavior
