= Dust bathing =

Animal behavior

A house sparrow having a dust bath

Dust bathing (also called sand bathing) is an animal behavior characterized by rolling or moving around in dust, dry earth or sand, with the likely purpose of removing parasites from fur, feathers or skin. Dust bathing is a maintenance behavior performed by a wide range of mammalian and avian species. For some animals, dust baths are necessary to maintain healthy feathers, skin, or fur, similar to bathing in water or wallowing in mud. In some mammals, dust bathing may be a way of transmitting chemical signals (or pheromones) to the ground which marks an individual's territory.

== Birds ==
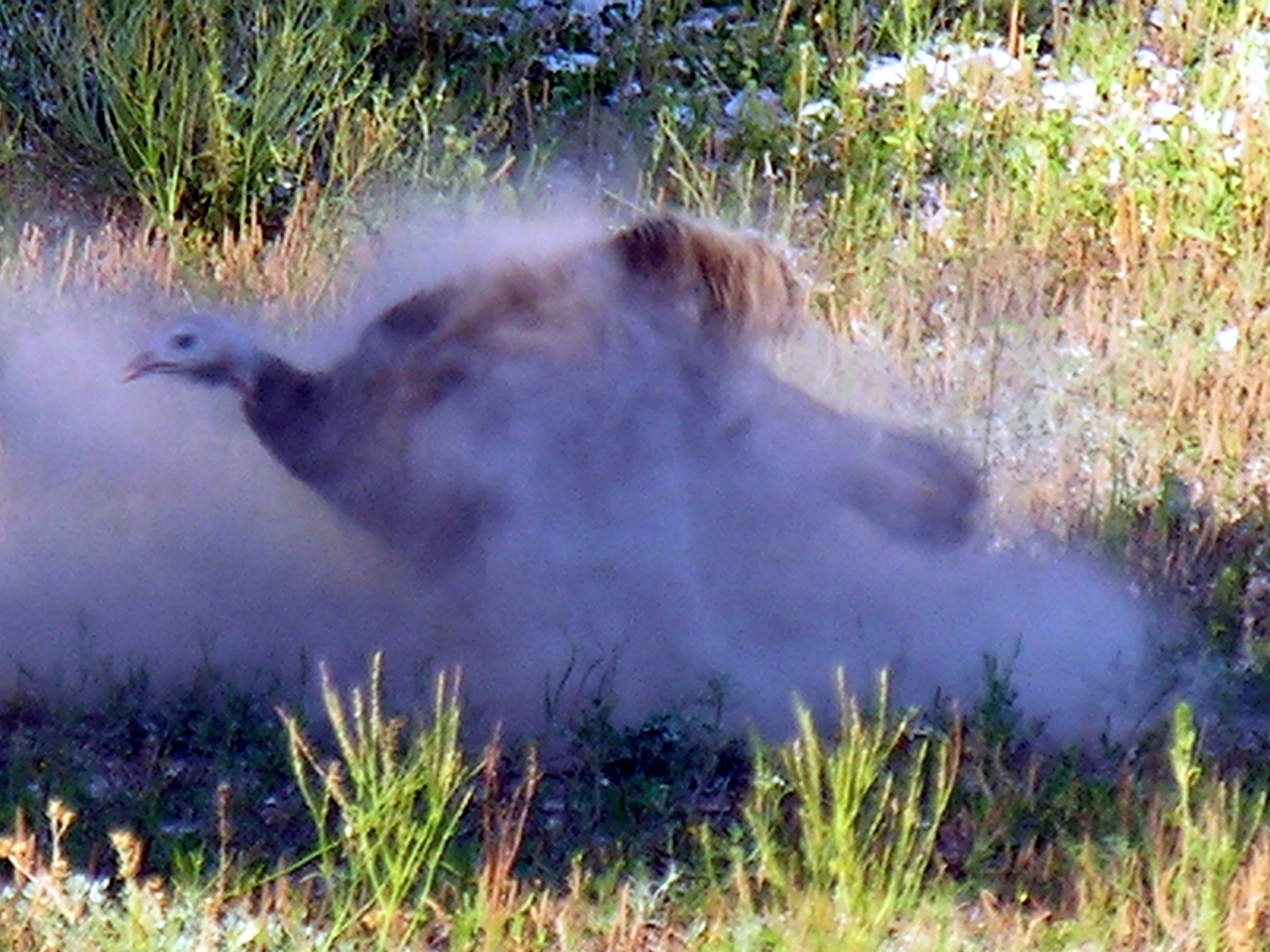
A dust bathing turkey

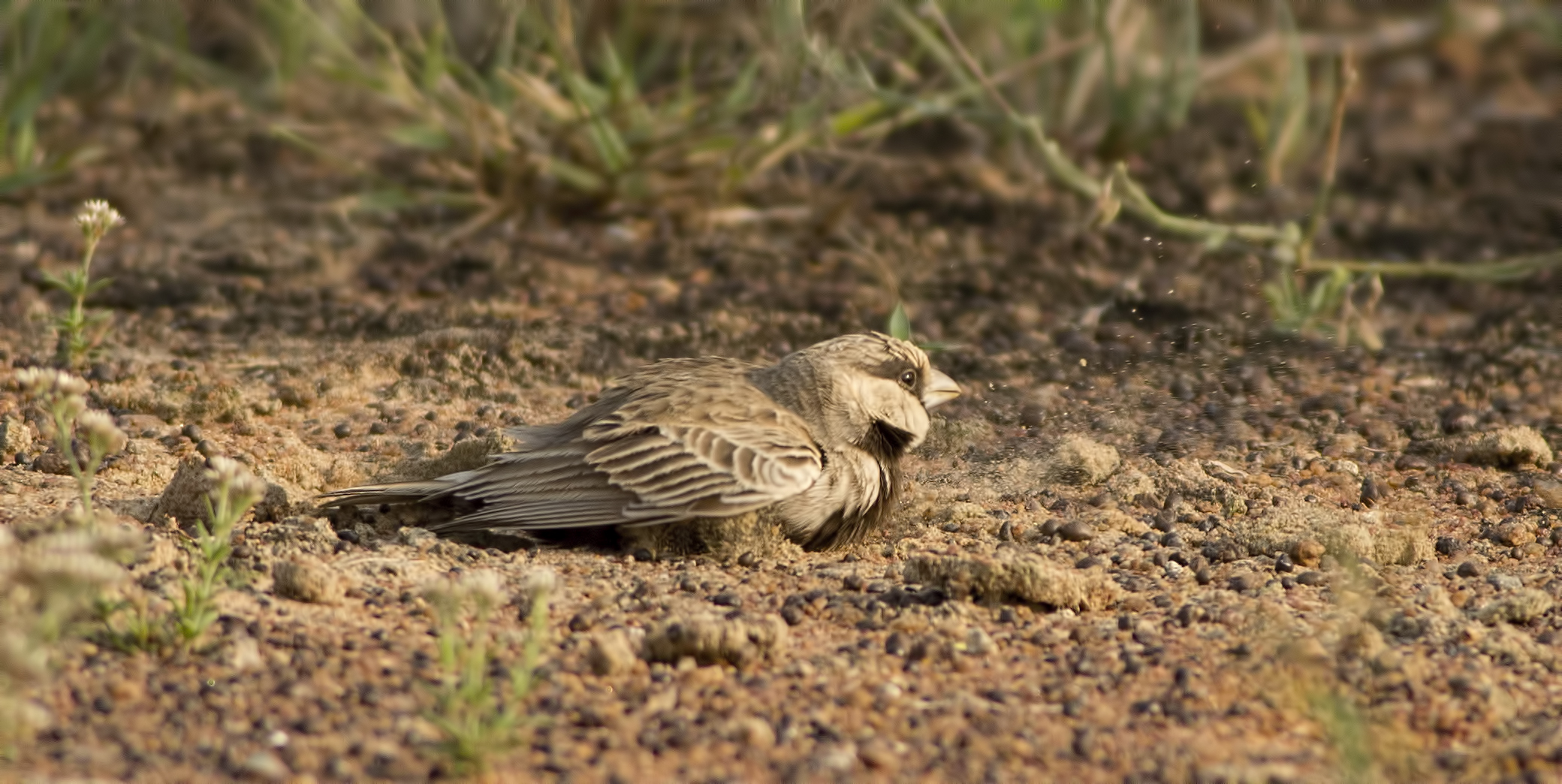
Ashy-crowned sparrow-lark bird dust bathing

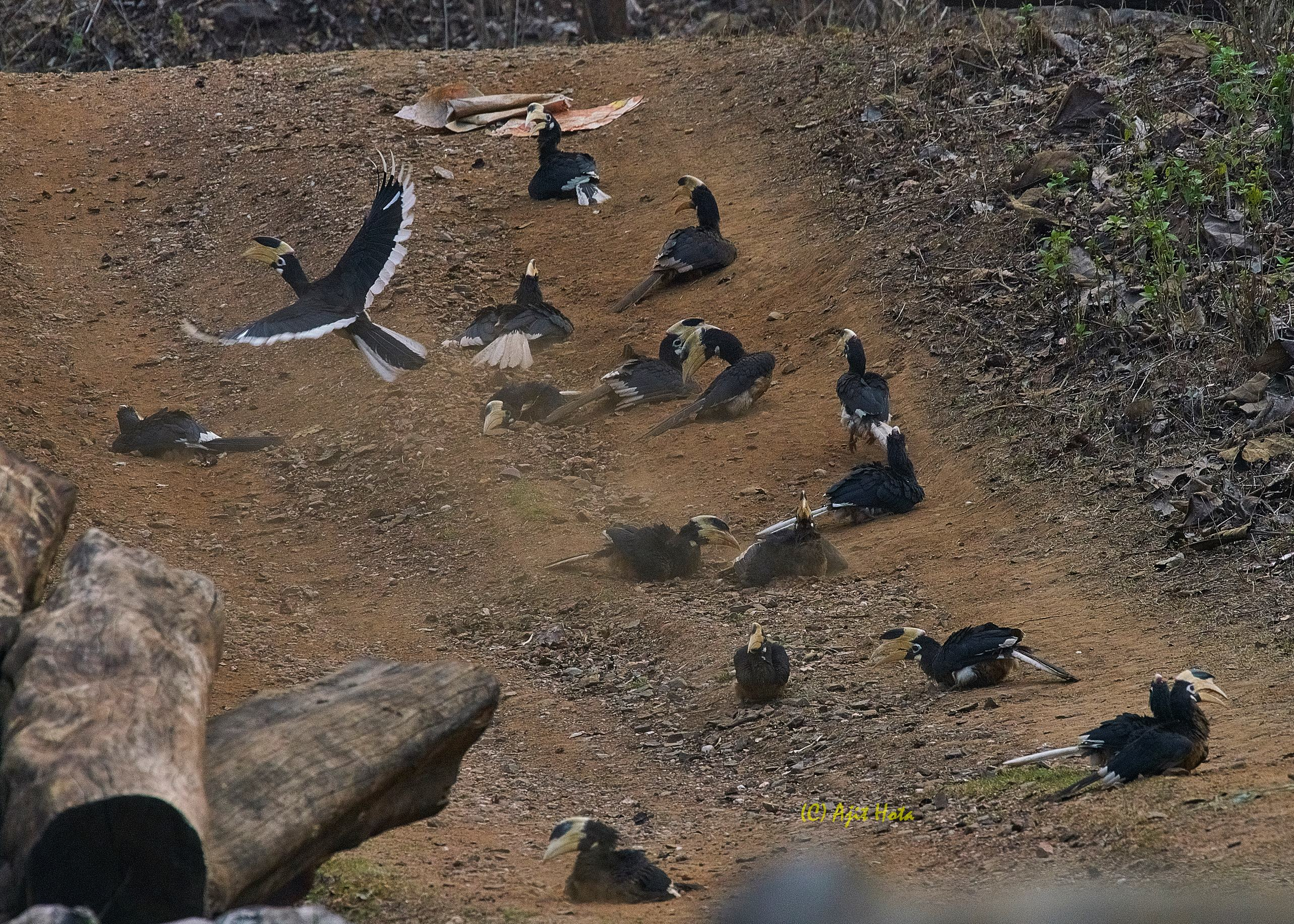
A group of Malabar pied hornbill birds dust bathing in India

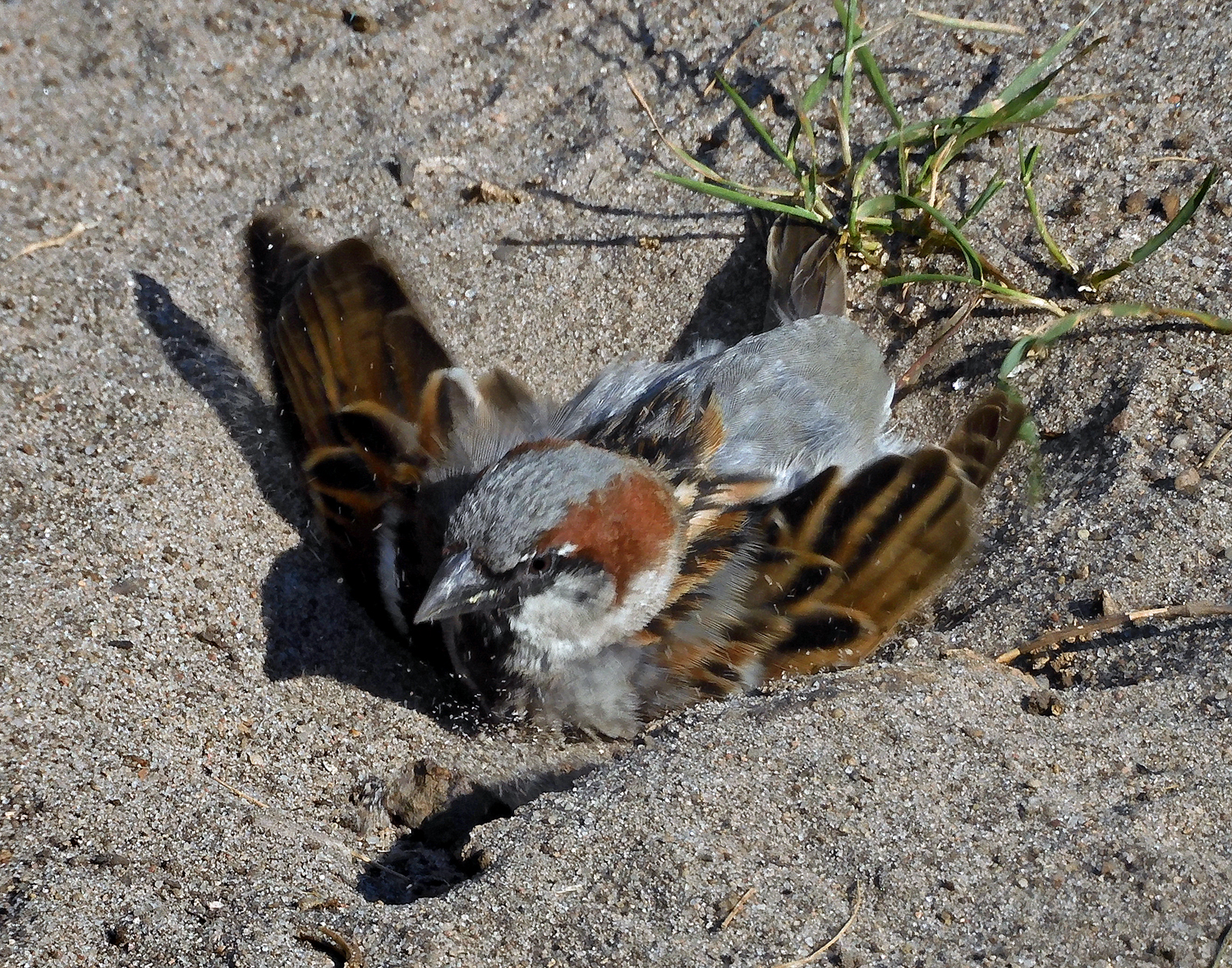
A house sparrow having a dust bath.

Birds crouch close to the ground while taking a dust bath, vigorously wriggling their bodies and flapping their wings. This disperses loose substrate into the air. The birds spread one or both wings which allows the falling substrate to fall between the feathers and reach the skin. The dust bath is often followed by thorough shaking to further ruffle the feathers which may be accompanied with preening using the bill.

The California quail is a highly sociable bird; one of their daily communal activities is a dust bath. A group of quail will select an area where the ground has been freshly turned or is soft. Using their underbellies, they burrow downward into the soil about 2–5 cm (1–2 in). They then wriggle about in the indentations, flapping their wings and ruffling their feathers, causing dust to rise in the air. They seem to prefer sunny places in which to create these dust baths. An ornithologist is able to detect the presence of quail in an area by spotting the circular indentations left behind in the soft dirt, some 7–15 cm (3–6 in) in diameter.

Birds without a uropygial gland (e.g., the emu, kiwi, ostrich and bustard) rely on dust bathing to keep their feathers healthy and dry.

== Domestic chicken ==
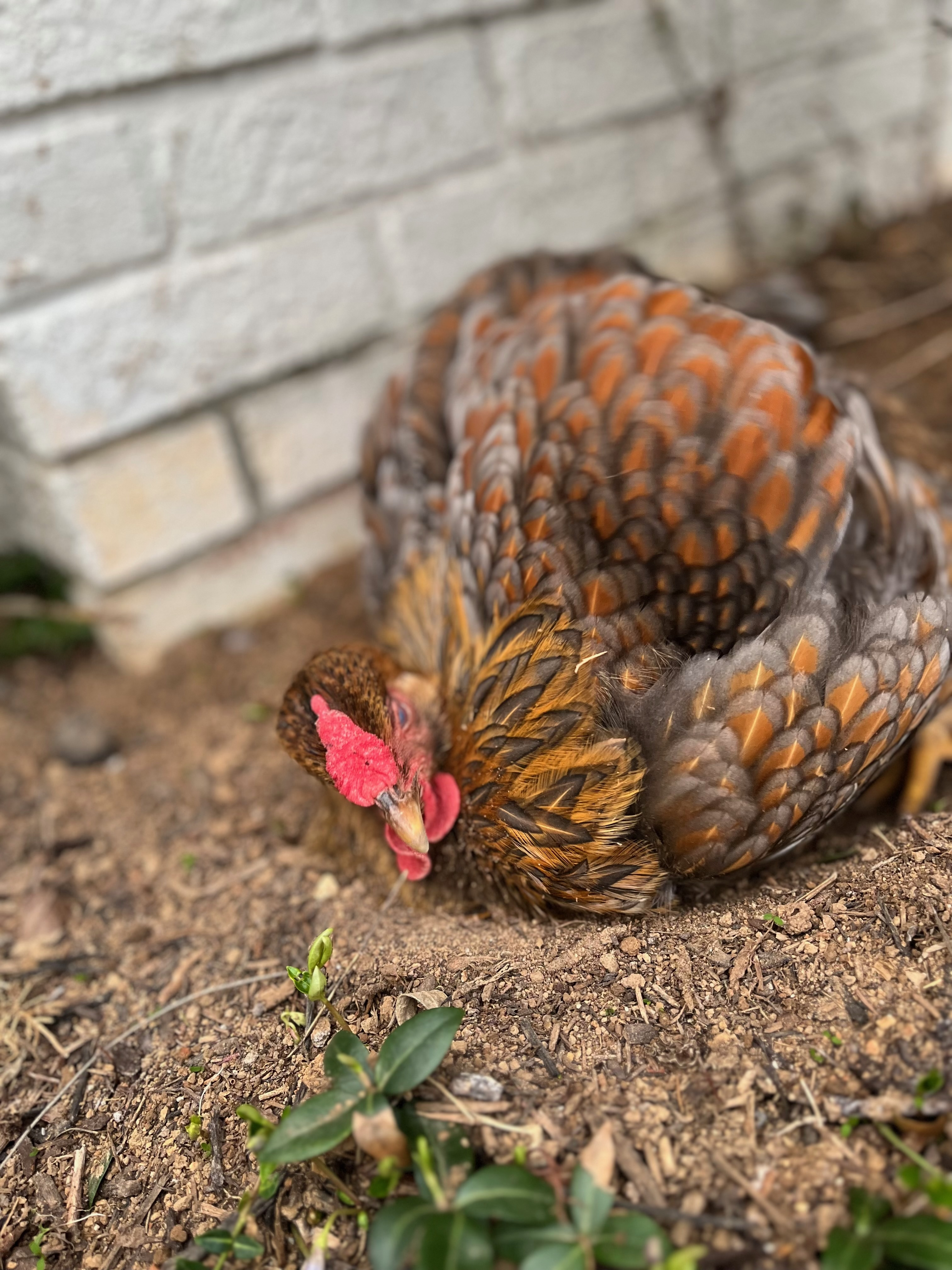
A Wyandotte chicken dust bathing

Dust bathing has been extensively studied in the domestic hen. In normal dust bathing, the hen initially scratches and bill-rakes at the ground, then erects her feathers and squats. Once lying down, the behavior contains four main elements: vertical wing-shaking, head rubbing, bill-raking and scratching with one leg. The dust collects between the feathers and is then subsequently shaken off which may reduce the amount of feather lipids and so help the plumage maintain good insulating capacity and may help control of ectoparasites.

=== Preferences for substrate ===
Hens exhibit preferences for dust bathing substrate. When given a choice between wood shavings, lignocellulose (soft wood fibre, pelleted), Astroturf mat without substrate, or food particles, the time spent dust bathing and number of dust baths were higher in lignocellulose compared with wood shavings, food particles, and Astroturf. The average duration of a single dust bath was longer in food particles compared with lignocellulose and wood shavings. Most vertical wing shakes and scratching bouts within a single dust bath were observed in lignocellulose. Bill raking occurred more frequently in wood shavings and lignocellulose in comparison to the other substrates. No differences in the relative durations of behavioral patterns within a single dust bath were found. In contrast, other research shows that straw or wood-shavings were no more attractive than feathers as a substrate for dust bathing.

=== Motivation ===
Dust bathing is motivated by complex interactions between internal factors which build up over time, peripheral factors relating to the skin and feathers, and external factors, such as the sight of a dusty substrate.

==== Internal factors ====
The tendency to dust bathe fluctuates according to time of day, with more dust bathing occurring in the middle of the day which suggests some type of endogenous circadian rhythm of motivation. If birds are denied the opportunity to dustbathe, the tendency to dustbathe increases with time, suggesting a Lorenzian build-up of motivation.

==== Peripheral factors ====
Peripheral factors seem relatively unimportant in controlling dust bathing. Deprivation of dust bathing results in an increase in lipids on the feathers and a subsequent increase in dust bathing activity when this is allowed. However, although it has been speculated that the function of dust bathing is probably removal of excess lipids on the feathers, lipid accumulation as a major cause of dust bathing has not been proven. A 1991 experiment by Van Liere, et al. of the Wageningen Agricultural University of the Netherlands could only increase the duration of dust bathing bouts marginally by spreading lipids, equivalent to 1–2 months' accumulation, on birds' feathers. Moreover, removal of the oil gland in chicks, which eliminated the main source of lipids, had no effect on subsequent dust bathing. It therefore seems that the main effects of deprivation of dust bathing in hens act through a central mechanism and not a peripheral one.

==== External factors ====
Environmental temperature is an important external factor; the frequency of dust bathing is greater at 22 °C (72 °F) than at 10 °C (50 °F). Addition of supplementary visible light also increases components of dust bathing, and when hens are individually housed, the presence of a group of hens dust bathing in an adjoining pen with a dust bath increased dust bathing compared with the amount occurring when the hens were absent from the pen., i.e. there is a strong influence of social facilitation.

Wrens and House Sparrows frequently follow a water bath with a dust bath (one reason to suspect an anti-parasite function for dusting). Overall, the amount of time and effort birds put into bathing and dusting indicates how critical feather maintenance may be. Keeping feathers functional requires constant care.

==== Sham dustbathing ====
Battery cages for domestic egg-laying hens usually have no dust bathing substrate. This is considered to be a welfare concern and as a consequence, dust bathing has been closely studied in domestic egg-laying hens. In the absence of substrate in cages, hens often perform sham dust bathing, a behavior during which the birds perform all the elements of normal dust bathing, but in the complete absence of any substrate.

== Mammals ==
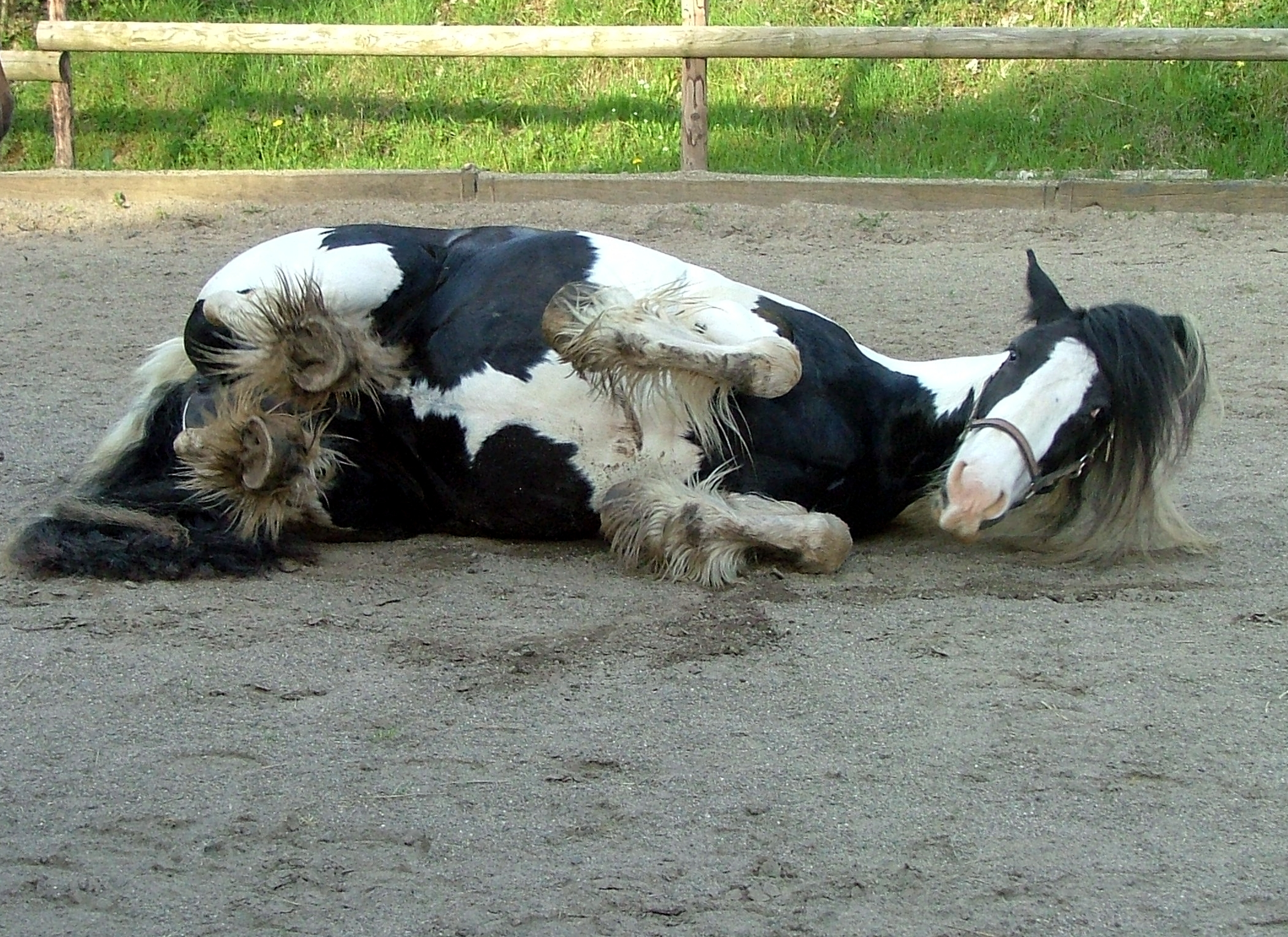
A horse taking a sand bath

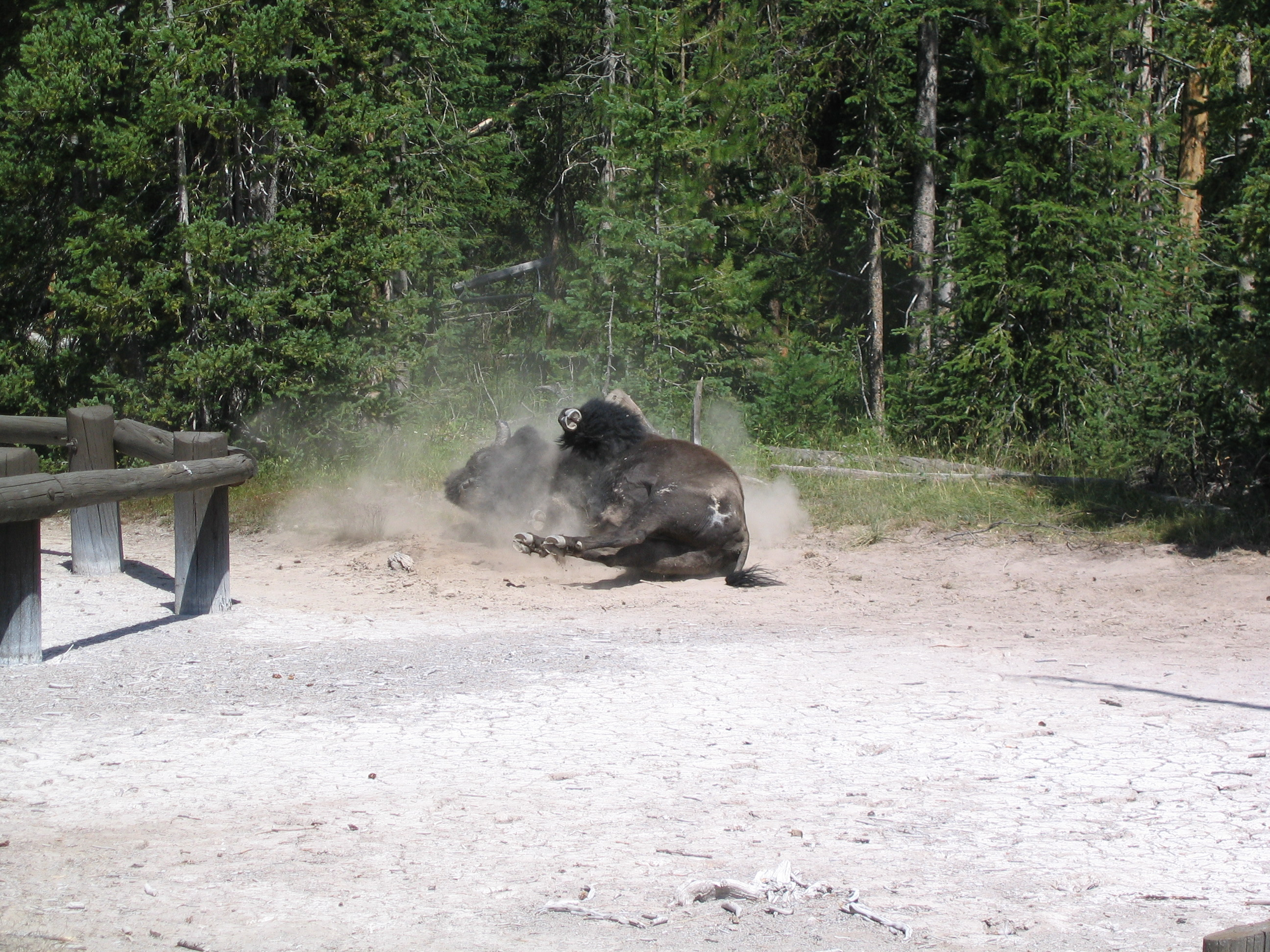
An American bison dust bathing in Yellowstone National Park

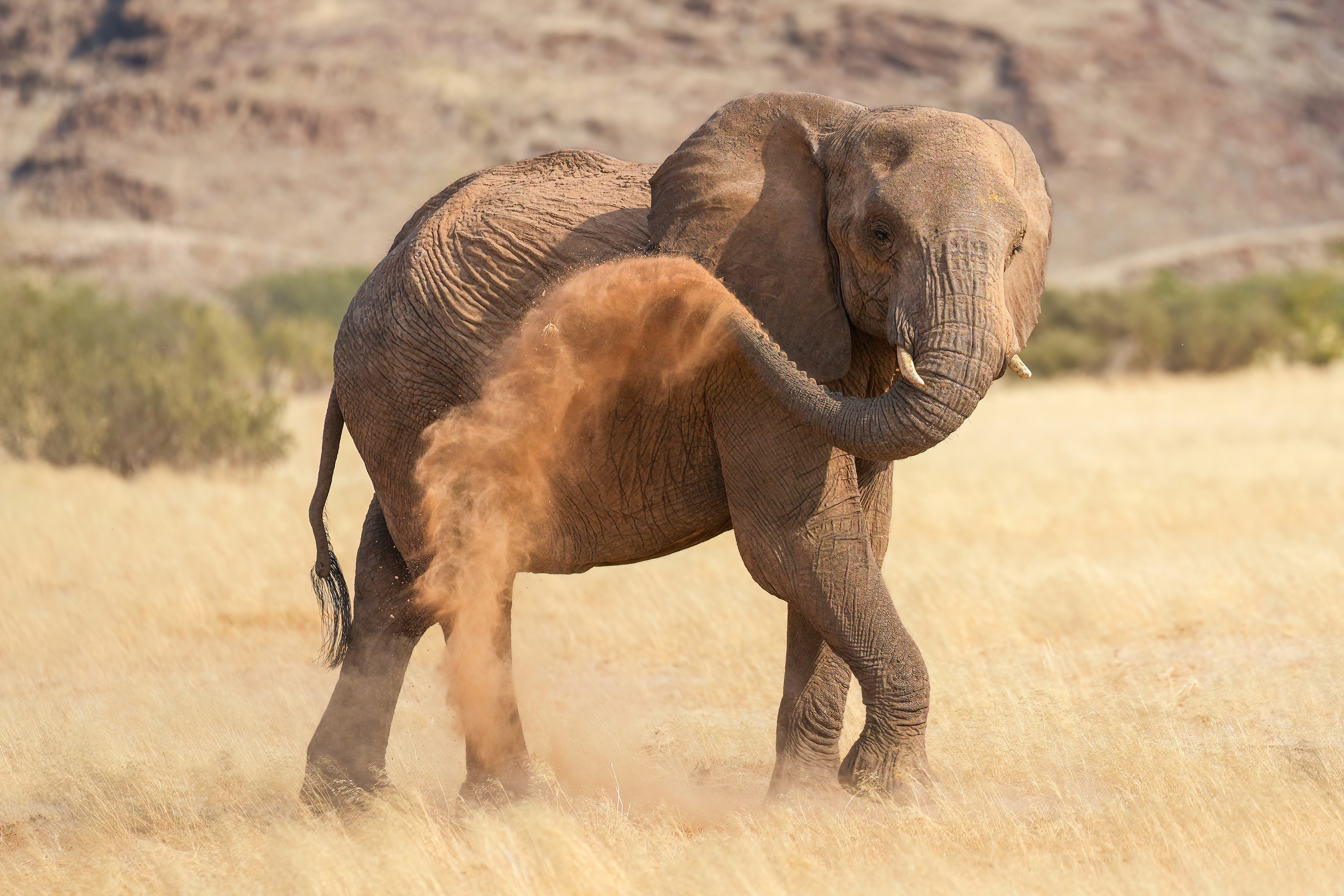
Elephant dust bathing in Namibia

Many mammals roll in sand or dirt, presumably to keep parasites away or to help dry themselves after exercise or becoming wet. A sand roll, which is a stall or yard covered with deep sand, is traditionally included as part of stable complexes for use by racehorses after exercise.

Dust bathing has been suggested to have a communicatory function in several mammals such as the common degu (Octodon degus), the long-eared jerboa (Euchoreutes naso), and possibly in Belding's ground squirrel as they leave a "pungent" odor in the dust bathing areas. It has been suggested that wallowing (a behavior similar to dust bathing) may serve functions such as thermoregulation, providing a sunscreen, ecto-parasite control and scent-marking.

Mammals that perform dust bathing include:

- Bison
- Cape ground squirrel
- Chinchilla
- Cat
- Dog
- Degu
- Elephant
- Gerbil
- Hamster
- Horse
- Jerboa
- Kangaroo rat
- Llama
- Pig
- Prairie dog

== See also ==
- Chickens as pets
- Tayammum; Islamic act of dry ablution using sand or dust.
