= List of largest poultry slaughtering companies in Europe =

The list of largest poultry slaughtering companies in Europe shows the largest companies of the poultry industry in Europe.

The list comprises companies that are all slaughtering chicken and most of them additionally other poultry such as turkey and ducks. The companies are also active in meat processing and packing as well as the production of meat products such as sausages.

== List (2021) ==
The following list sorts the 10 largest poultry slaughtering companies in Europe by the number of slaughtered poultry in the year 2021.

Rank	Company name	Headquarters	Number of slaughtered poultry annually in millions
1	LDC Group	Sablé-sur-Sarthe, France	578,5
2	2 Sisters Food Group (Part of Boparan Holdings)	Birmingham, United Kingdom	520,0
3	MHP	Kyiv, Ukraine	492,0
4	Plukon Food Group	Wezep, Netherlands	468,0
5	Gruppo Veronesi	Verona, Italy	350,0
6	PHW Group	Visbek, Germany	350,0
7	Gap Resurs	Moscow, Russia	346,8
8	Cherkizovo	Moscow, Russia	322,4
9	Moy Park (Part of Pilgrim's Pride)	Craigavon, United Kingdom	312,0
10	Amadori	San Vittore di Cesena, Italy	250,0

== List (2018) ==
The following list sorts the 11 largest poultry slaughtering companies in Europe by the number of slaughtered poultry in the year 2018.

Rank	Company name	Headquarters	Number of slaughtered poultry annually in millions
1	LDC Group	Sablé-sur-Sarthe, France	541.2
2	Plukon Food Group	Wezep, Netherlands	426.4
3	Cherkizovo	Moscow, Russia	397.0
4	Gruppo Veronesi	Verona, Italy	350.0
5	PHW Group	Rechterfeld, Germany	350.0
6	MHP	Kyiv, Ukraine	349.0
7	2 Sisters Food Group	Birmingham, United Kingdom	323.0
8	Moy Park	Craigavon, United Kingdom	312.0
9	Amadori	San Vittore di Cesena, Italy	250.0
10	Gap Resurs	Moscow, Russia	228.6
11	Prioskolye	Belgorod, Russia	223.0
