= WIMEX Group =

German poultry production company

Coordinates: 51°42′33.0″N 11°58′51.00″E

WIMEX Agrarprodukte Import und Export GmbH (WIMEX Group)
- Industry: Agribusiness, Meat industry
- Founded: 1985; 41 years ago
- Founder: Gerhard Wagner
- Fate: m
- Headquarters: Köthen, Germany
- Area served: Worldwide
- Key people: Ulrich Wagner, Leopold Graf von Drechsel, Ralph Weickert
- Products: Day-old chicks
- Revenue: €295.158 million (2021)
- Owner: Wagner family, PHW Group
- Number of employees: 1262 (2021)
- Website: www.wimex-group.com

The WIMEX Group is an internationally active German company in the meat and agricultural industry, based in Köthen, Saxony-Anhalt. With an annual capacity of 435.455 million hatching eggs, it is the largest producer of day-old chicks for chicken fattening in Europe and one of the world's largest suppliers of broiler chickens of the Cobb breed. Its revenue in 2021 was €295,158 million. Just under 50 percent of the company's shares are owned by the PHW Group.

The family-run group of companies consists of 28 individual companies, the parent company being WIMEX Agrarprodukte Import und Export GmbH with administrative headquarters in Regenstauf, Bavaria.

WIMEX has repeatedly come under criticism. Among other things, the company has been accused of animal cruelty and environmental damage.

== History ==
In 1961, the poultry group Lohmann (now PHW Group) started up the broiler hatchery Brüterei Süd in Regenstauf. Gerhard Wagner came to Regenstauf in the course of this as a field representative of Lohmann and later became managing director of the hatchery. In 1985, Wagner finally founded the WIMEX Agrarprodukte Import und Export GmbH 1985 in Regenstauf for the production of hatching eggs. In the 1990s, the company expanded into Eastern Germany. There, the company invested extensively in agricultural land, making it one of the larger investors in the agricultural land market in the new states of Germany.

In 1998, WIMEX took over the distribution of the Cobb breeding line under the name Cobb Germany as a franchisee of the international breeding company Cobb-Vantress (part of Tyson Foods). From 2005 onwards, WIMEX expanded into the Netherlands. In 2017, WIMEX opened two newly built hatcheries, in Elsnigk as well as Vreden.

The company's founder Gerhard Wagner presided over the operational management from 1985 to 2019. Since then, the company has been managed by three managing directors: Ulrich Wagner, Leopold Graf von Drechsel and Ralph Weickert.

In 2020, WIMEX founded the joint venture WIMEX & Friends Energy GmbH & Co. KG with the Freitag Group for the construction of photovoltaic systems on stables.

In March 2021, H5N8 avian influenza broke out at a WIMEX farm in Nittenau, Bavaria. As a result, around 52,000 animals were culled by gathering them in containers and subsequent CO_{2} flooding. A restricted area was established around the WIMEX farm, and restocking of the barn was officially prohibited for 21 days. It remained unclear whether the virus was introduced via a wild bird, due to poor hygiene, or through contaminated feed.

== Shareholders ==
The largest shareholder, with a stake of 49.25%, is the Wagner Family Foundation based in Regenstauf. The PHW Group, the largest company in the German poultry industry, is the second-largest shareholder, with a stake of 48.76%. The other shares belong to WIMEX Agrarprodukte Import und Export GmbH itself as well as to the founder Gerhard Wagner (0.49%).

== Structure ==
The poultry division makes up the largest business unit with €215,998 million and 73.18% of total sales. In addition, the company is active in agriculture (€78.317 million, or 26.53%) and fodder production (€0.843 million, or 29%).

=== Poultry ===
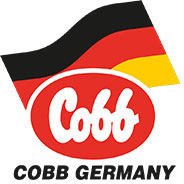
Logo of Cobb Germany

WIMEX achieves a high level of vertical integration by keeping grandparent as well as parent stock in various poultry companies. It is active in operating hatcheries, selling day-old chicks, fattening chickens, producing feed and operating feed plants.

For grandparenting, WIMEX has 36 farms in Germany, producing 10 million chickens of the Cobb breed annually. For parenting, the company runs 97 farms. To hatch the hatching eggs, the company runs a number of hatcheries. Day-old chicks are marketed internationally. Important customers are the PHW Group, Plukon and the Sprehe Group.

The company also operates chicken fattening plants. The 6 fattening facilities have a capacity for 830,790 chickens and produce 8 million broilers annually.

WIMEX has a 40.83% stake in Cobb Espanola SA and a 50% stake in Cobb Russia. Cobb Russia supplies Russia's largest poultry meat producer Cherkizovo, among others.

=== Agriculture ===
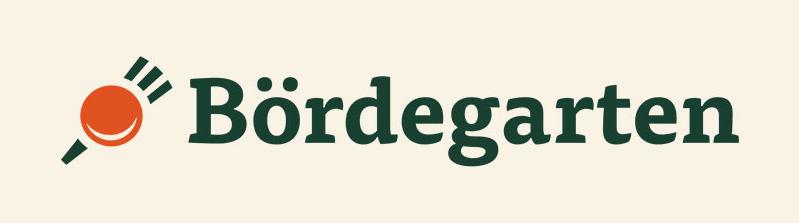
Bördegarten vegetable brand logo

WIMEX owns more than 8000 hectares of arable land for feed cultivation using conventional farming methods. Most of the cultivation is carried out by the subsidiary Agrargesellschaft Wulfen mbH. The produce, mainly grain and corn, is used for the group's internal feed supply.

Furthermore, WIMEX cultivates vegetables on 800 hectares. WIMEX markets the produce, including radishes and carrots, under the brand Bördegarten Gemüse.

== Other activities ==
Managing director Gerhard Wagner was president of the lobby organisation Zentralverband der Deutschen Geflügelwirtschaft (Central Association of the German Poultry Industry, ZDG) from 2001 to 2011. From 2011 to 2016, managing director Leopold Graf von Drechsel was president of the ZDG and on the executive committee of the Arbeitsgemeinschaft Deutscher Tierzüchter (Association of German Animal Breeders).

== Awards ==
WIMEX founder Gerhard Wagner received the Federal Cross of Merit in 2013 for his contribution to the integration of the two German states after reunification.

== Controversies ==
=== Environmental damage ===
WIMEX has repeatedly been accused of being responsible for environmental damage due to high ammonia emissions. According to the Heinrich Böll Foundation's meat atlas (Fleischatlas), WIMEX was one of the largest emitters of ammonia in Mecklenburg-Western Pomerania, contributing to the acidification of soils, the overfertilization of groundwater and the formation of health-damaging particulate matter.

In 2017, the research organization Correctiv published a data analysis according to which the nitrate content of the groundwater around the WIMEX farms in and around Baasdorf exceeded the limit value by almost double.

=== Animal cruelty ===
In 2010, ARD magazin Report Mainz broadcast footage published by the animal rights organization PETA of a parent-animal farm in Natenstedt, Lower Saxony, which showed chickens being kicked and thrown several meters against walls. The parent-animal farm was a WIMEX contract producer, and the buyer of the hatching eggs was the PHW Group subsidiary Wiesenhof. Peta criticized the conditions as massive animal welfare violations. The PHW Group admitted that the recordings showed animal cruelty, the conditions were inexcusable and not compatible with the animal welfare guidelines for parent animal farms. According to PHW Group, these were individual cases, the company had drawn personal consequences.

In 2016, the television magazine Panorama broadcast footage published by the animal rights organization Animal Rights Watch (ARIWA) of animal farms run by leading officials of German agricultural associations. Among them were parent-animal farms run by WIMEX, whose CEO Graf von Drechsel was president of the Zentralverband der Deutschen Geflügelwirtschaft at the time. ARIWA spoke of massive animal welfare violations. Von Drechsel confirmed that the footage came from WIMEX farms and that back and shoulder injuries had been poorly treated.

In 2017, the television magazine Frontal 21 and Spiegel Online reported on recent footage published by ARIWA from five WIMEX parent animal farms in Baasdorf, Rosefeld, Wettin-Löbejün, Wettin, and Pilsenhöh. The footage showed featherless chickens with festering wounds as well as chickens lying dead on the floor. The footage also showed animals being killed in a manner contrary to animal welfare by having their necks twisted. ARIWA also criticized the fact that fodder was only available for one hour a day and that water was not continuously available either, which led to the sensation of hunger given the animals were bred for rapid weight gain. Michaela Dämmrich, official veterinarian and animal welfare officer of the state of Lower Saxony, classified parts of the recorded conditions as animal welfare violations and described the husbandry system as inappropriate for animals. WIMEX stated that it took the accusations very seriously, but could not provide a detailed assessment.

=== Subsidies ===
In 2017, the investigative journalism organisation Correctiv published research on how many subsidies WIMEX receives through its various subsidiaries and then cross-referenced the findings with data on pollutant emissions from the farms. Correctiv criticized that WIMEX receives public subsidies in large amounts, but at the same time harms the common good in the form of factory farming as well as environmental pollution.

In 2018, Der Spiegel reported that WIMEX had received around €275,000 in EU agricultural subsidies the year before and criticized the fact that the payment of the money was not linked to environmental or animal welfare requirements and that WIMEX did not have to pay anything back despite documented misconduct.

=== Landgrabbing ===
According to the Johann Heinrich von Thünen Institute, WIMEX is one of the major investors in the agricultural land market in the new states. The Arbeitsgemeinschaft bäuerliche Landwirtschaft criticized the actions of WIMEX and other investors as East German land grabbing. The yearbook critical farming report (Kritischer Agrarbericht) registered WIMEX in a list of agro-industrial large-scale landowners that would destroy many times more farm jobs and endanger agricultural structures.

=== Food waste ===
WIMEX has been accused of food waste in vegetable production by local residents. Truckloads of fresh vegetables were dumped and plowed under in the fields instead of being marketed or given to those in need. WIMEX defended the practice by saying that it would be nothing unusual and resulted from high specifications by the purchasing retail chains.

=== Protests ===
Animal rights and environmental activists have repeatedly protested against new construction projects pursued by WIMEX. Regarding a planned construction in Cochstedt with a capacity of 80,000 animals, WIMEX announced in June 2016 that it would not pursue the project due to ongoing protest from the public.
