= Agricultural subsidy =

Governmental subsidy paid to farmers and agribusinesses

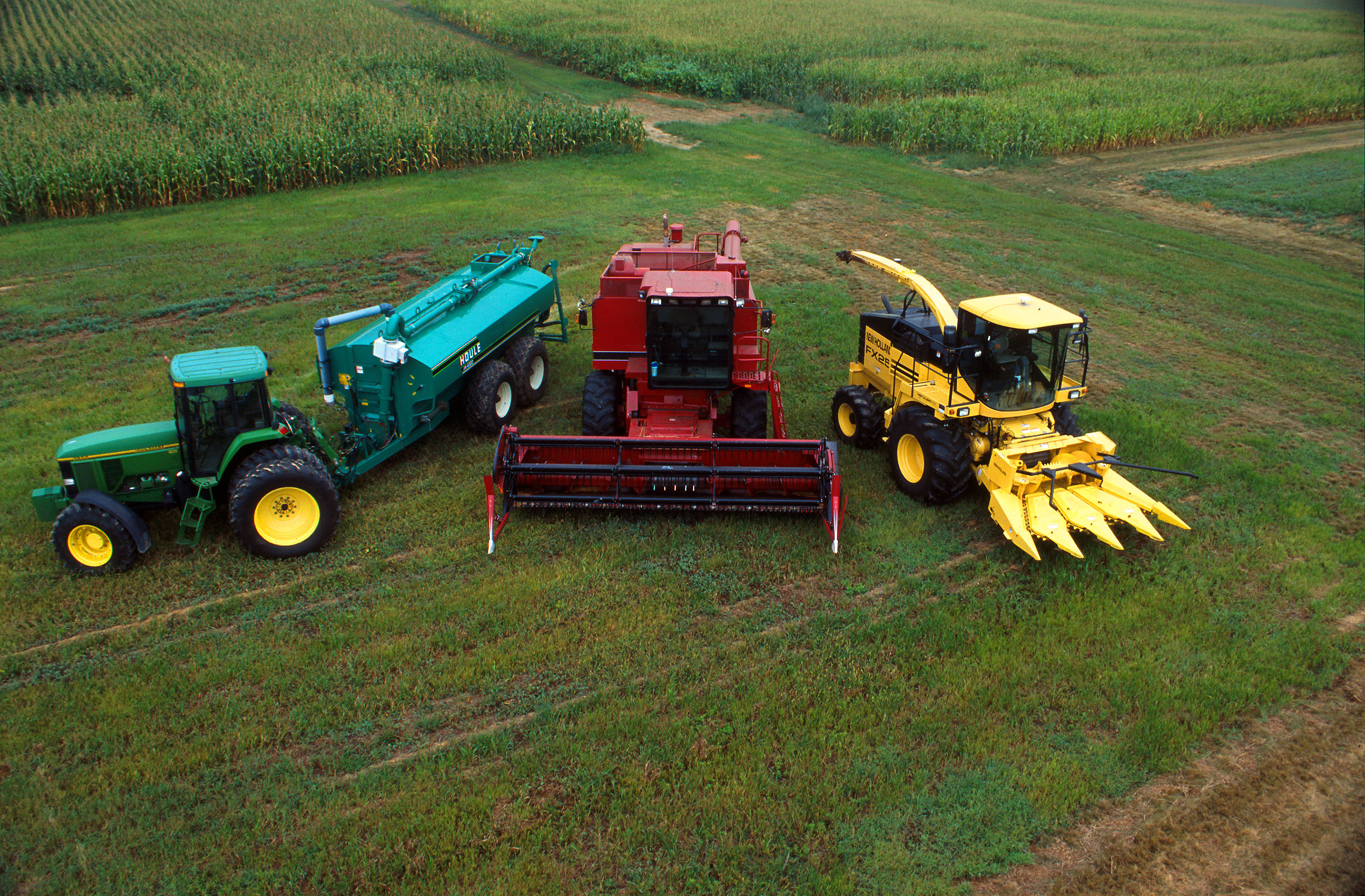
Agribusiness: a display of a John Deere 7800 tractor with Houle slurry trailer, Case IH combine harvester, New Holland FX 25 forage harvester with corn head

An agricultural subsidy (also called an agricultural incentive) is a government incentive paid to agribusinesses, agricultural organizations and farms to supplement their income, manage the supply of agricultural products, and influence the cost and supply of such commodities.

Examples of such commodities include: wheat, feed grains (grain used as fodder, such as maize or corn, sorghum, barley and oats), cotton, milk, rice, peanuts, sugar, tobacco, oilseeds such as soybeans and meat products such as beef, pork, and lamb and mutton.

A 2021 study by the UN Food and Agriculture Organization found $540 billion was given to farmers every year between 2013 and 2018 in global subsidies. The study found these subsidies are harmful in a number of ways.

In under-developed countries, they encourage consumption of low-nutrition staples, such as rice. Subsidies also encourage deforestation; and they also drive inequality because smallholder farmers (many of whom are women) are excluded. According to UNDP head, Achim Steiner, redirecting subsidies would boost the livelihoods of 500 million smallholder farmers worldwide by creating a more level playing field with large-scale agricultural enterprises. A separate report, by the World Resources Institute in August 2021, said without reform, farm subsidies "will render vast expanses of healthy land useless".

== History ==
One of the earliest known interventions in farming markets was the English Corn Laws, which regulated the import and export of grain in Great Britain and Ireland for centuries. The laws were repealed in 1846. Agricultural subsidies in the twentieth century were originally designed to stabilize markets, help low-income farmers, and aid rural development. In the United States, President Franklin D. Roosevelt signed the Agricultural Adjustment Act, as part of the New Deal in 1933. At the time the economy was in a severe depression and farmers were experiencing the lowest agricultural prices since the 1890s. The plan was to increase prices for a range of agricultural products by paying farmers to destroy some of their livestock or not use some of their land - known as land idling. This led to a reduction in supply and smaller agricultural surpluses. Initially seven products were controlled: (corn, wheat, cotton, rice, peanuts, tobacco and milk). Unlike traditional subsidies that promote the growth of products, this process boosted agricultural prices by limiting the growth of these crops.

In Europe, Common Agricultural Policy (CAP) was launched in 1962 to improve agricultural productivity. According to the European Commission, the act aims to

- Support farmers and improve agricultural productivity, so that consumers have a stable supply of affordable food
- Ensure that European Union (EU) farmers can make a reasonable living
- Help tackling climate change and the sustainable management of natural resources
- Maintain rural areas and landscapes across the EU
- Keep the rural economy alive by promoting jobs in farming, agri-foods industries and associated sectors

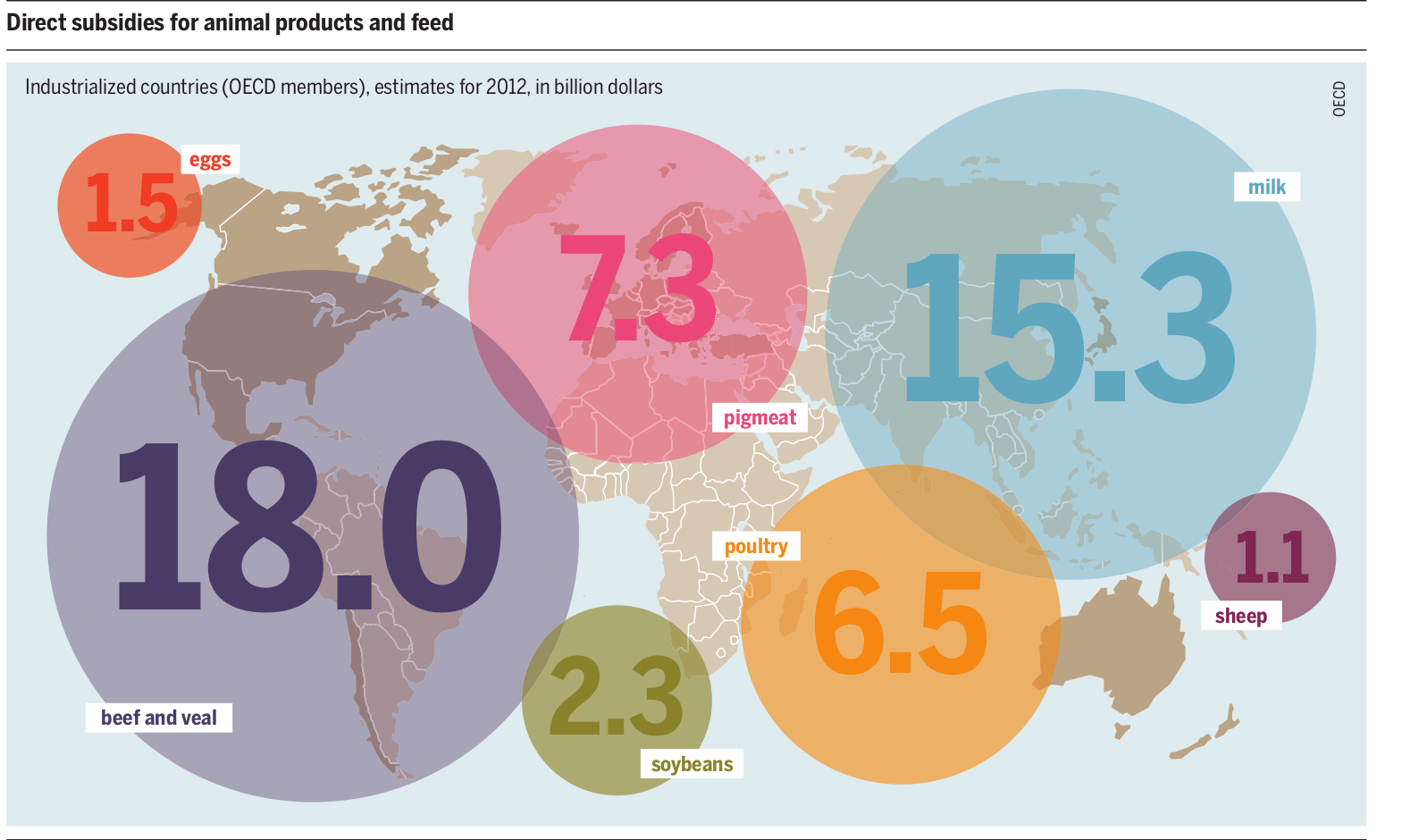
OECD countries support their livestock and dairy industries with subsidies worth billions of dollars.

== By region ==
=== Canada ===
Canadian agricultural subsidies are currently controlled by Agriculture and Agri-Food Canada. Financial subsidies are offered through the Canadian Agricultural Partnership Programs. The Canadian Agricultural Partnership began in April 2018 and is planned to take place over five years with a combined federal, provincial and territorial investment of three billion dollars. Some programs offered surround issues including AgriAssurance, agricultural leveraging programs, promoting diversity in agriculture, crop and livestock insurance, marketing activities, risk mitigation, and more. Before the Canadian Agricultural Partnership, agricultural subsidies were organized under the Growing Forward 2 partnership from 2013 to 2018.

=== European Union ===
In 2010, the EU spent €57 billion on agricultural development, of which €39 billion was spent on direct subsidies. Agricultural and fisheries subsidies form over 40% of the EU budget. Since 1992 (and especially since 2005), the EU's Common Agricultural Policy has undergone significant change as subsidies have mostly been decoupled from production. The largest subsidy is the Single Farm Payment.

=== Malawi ===
Increases in food and fertilizer prices have underlined the vulnerability of poor urban and rural households in many developing countries, especially in Africa, renewing policymakers' focus on the need to increase staple food crop productivity.

A study by the Overseas Development Institute evaluates the benefits of the Malawi Government Agricultural Inputs Subsidy Programme, which was implemented in 2006–2007 to promote access to and use of fertilizers in both maize and tobacco production to increase agricultural productivity and food security. The subsidy was implemented by means of a coupon system which could be redeemed by the recipients for fertilizer types at approximately one-third of the normal cash price. According to policy conclusions of the Overseas Development Institute the voucher for coupon system can be an effective way of rationing and targeting subsidy access to maximize production and economic and social gains. Many practical and political challenges remain in the program design and implementation required to increase efficiency, control costs, and limit patronage and fraud.

=== New Zealand ===
New Zealand is reputed to have the most open agricultural markets in the world after radical reforms started in 1984 by the Fourth Labour Government stopped all subsidies.

In 1984 New Zealand's Labor government took the dramatic step of ending all farm subsidies, which then consisted of 30 separate production payments and export incentives. This was a truly striking policy action, because New Zealand's economy is roughly five times more dependent on farming than is the U.S. economy, measured by either output or employment. Subsidies in New Zealand accounted for more than 30 percent of the value of production before reform, somewhat higher than U.S. subsidies today. And New Zealand farming was marred by the same problems caused by U.S. subsidies, including overproduction, environmental degradation and inflated land prices.

As the country is a large agricultural exporter, continued subsidies by other countries are a long-standing bone of contention, with New Zealand being a founding member of the 20-member Cairns Group fighting to improve market access for exported agricultural goods.

=== Turkey ===
The 2024 agricultural support budget was €2.7 billion. In 2019–21 about 20% of gross farm income was government support, mostly market price support, particularly for potatoes, wheat, sunflower seed and beef. Diesel and fertilizer payments were made, which may make the goal of net zero greenhouse gas emissions by 2053 more difficult. According to environmental group Doğa the subsidies for water intensive crops such as corn and sugar beet endanger wetlands in Turkey.

Farmers are not allowed to export wheat. Despite subsidies farmers' fuel and fertilizer costs increased a lot in 21/22 due to international price rises and the fall in the lira. The state's Grain Board (TMO)^{(Turkish)} sometimes pays more for foreign than Turkish wheat, and farmers complain that foreign wheat is sold at a discount: this is done so bread is cheaper, as Turks eat so much bread. A TMO objective is to stabilize grain prices. Cotton growing and oilseeds are subsidized. There is some support for organic farming. Some farmers say their debt is due to not enough state support.

Although a healthy amount of sugar is less than 50g a day for an adult the sugar production quota for market year 26/27 was 3 million tonnes, thus for the population of under 90 million about twice as much sugar is produced than is healthy. On average Turks consume 35 kilograms a year, mostly as confectionery.

=== United States ===
USDA fiscal year 2020 budget summary

The Farm Security and Rural Investment Act of 2002, also known as the 2002 Farm Bill, addressed a great variety of issues related to agriculture, ecology, energy, trade, and nutrition. Signed after the September 11th attacks of 2001, the act directs approximately $16.5 billion of government funding toward agricultural subsidies each year. This funding has had a great effect on the production of grains, oilseeds, and upland cotton. The United States paid allegedly around $20 billion in 2005 to farmers in direct subsidies as "farm income stabilization" via farm bills. Overall agricultural subsidies in 2010 were estimated at $172 billion by a European agricultural industry association; however, the majority of this estimate consists of food stamps and other consumer subsidies, so it is not comparable to the 2005 estimate.

Agricultural policies of the United States are changed, incrementally or more radically, by Farm Bills that are passed every five years or so. Statements about how the program works might be right at one point in time, at best, but are probably not sufficient for assessing agricultural policies at other points in time. For example, a large part of the support to program crops has not been linked directly to current output since the Federal Agriculture Improvement and Reform Act of 1996 (P.L. 104–127). Instead, these payments were tied to historical entitlement, not current planting. For example, it is incorrect to attribute a payment associated with the wheat base area to wheat production now because that land might be allocated to any of a number of permitted uses, including held idle. Over time, successive Farm Bills have linked these direct payments to market prices or revenue, but not to production. In contrast, some programs, like the Marketing Loan Program that can create something of a floor price that producers receive per unit sold, are tied to production. That is, if the price of wheat in 2002 was $3.80, farmers would get an extra 58¢ per bushel (52¢ plus the 6¢ price difference). Fruit and vegetable crops are not eligible for subsidies.

Corn was the top crop for subsidy payments prior to 2011. The Energy Policy Act of 2005 mandated that billions of gallons of ethanol be blended into vehicle fuel each year, guaranteeing demand, but US corn ethanol subsidies were between $5.5 billion and $7.3 billion per year. Producers also benefited from a federal subsidy of 51 cents per gallon, additional state subsidies, and federal crop subsidies that had brought the total to 85 cents per gallon or more. However, the federal ethanol subsidy expired 31 December 2011.

Researchers have suggested that United States agricultural subsidies have worsened trends of the country's rates of obesity and related health issues, by primarily subsidizing the production of corn, soybeans, and wheat, thus significantly reducing the cost of high-fructose corn syrup, vegetable oils, and grain-fed livestock.

2018 U.S. Loan Rates
Commodity	Loan Rates per Unit
Corn	$1.95/bushel
Upland cotton	$0.52/pound
Wheat	$2.94/bushel
Rice	$6.50/hundredweight
Peanuts	$355.00/ton
Soybeans	$5.00/bushel
Grain Sorghum	$1.95/bushel
Barley	$1.95/bushel
Oats	$1.39/bushel
Oilseed (sunflower, flaxseed, canola, rapeseed, safflower, mustard, crambe, sesame seed)	$0.1009/pound

=== Asia ===
Agricultural subsidies in Asia vary significantly across countries, reflecting differing policy priorities, levels of development, and agricultural dependence. Several Asian nations allocate substantial government support to their agricultural sectors through subsidies for inputs, credit, infrastructure, and price support mechanisms.

Farm subsidies in Asia remain a point of contention in global trade talks.

==== China ====
In 2016, China provided $212 billion in agricultural subsidies. In 2018, China increased their subsidies for soybean farmers in their northeastern provinces. Corn farmers, however, received reduced subsidies due to Beijing's 2017 policy that set out to reduce its huge stockpile. Soybean farmers in Liaoning, Jilin, Heilongjiang, and Inner Mongolia provinces will receive more subsidies from Beijing than corn farmers. The cutting of corn acreage and the lifting of soybean acreage came in 2016 as a push from China to re-balance grain stocks. Subsidies for agriculture machinery and equipment will also be provided by Beijing to farmers.

==== Indonesia ====
In 1971, as a method of expanding the rice supply in Indonesia, the government began subsidizing fertilizer to farmers after the discovery and introduction of new, high-yielding rice varieties. In 2012, Indonesia provided $28 billion in agricultural subsidies.

==== Japan ====
Over the 2000s, Japan has been reforming its generous agricultural subsidy regime to support more business-oriented farmers. Yet, subsidies remain high in international comparison. In 2009, Japan paid US$46.5 billion in subsidies to its farmers, and continued state support of farmers in Japan remains a controversial topic. In 2012, Japan provided $65 billion in agricultural subsidies.

==== South Korea ====
South Korea has made attempts to reform its agricultural sector, despite resistance from vested interests. In 2012, South Korea provided approximately $20 billion in agricultural subsidies.

==== India ====
Agricultural subsidy in India primarily consists of subsidies like, fertilizer, irrigation, equipment, credit subsidy, seed subsidy, export subsidy etc. Subsidy on fertilizers is provided by the Central government whereas subsidy on water and irrigation is provided by the local State governments. Drawing on the most recent estimates, annual central government subsidies to farmers would be of the order of ₹120,500 crore (equivalent to ₹1.5 trillion or US$17 billion in 2026) as the sum of fertilizer subsidies (₹70,000 crore (equivalent to ₹900 billion or US$9.6 billion in 2026), 2017/18), credit subsidies (₹20,000 crore (equivalent to ₹260 billion or US$2.7 billion in 2026), 2017/18), crop insurance subsidies (₹6,500 crore (equivalent to ₹83 billion or US$890 million in 2026), 2018/19) and expenditures towards price support (₹24,000 crore (equivalent to ₹310 billion or US$3.3 billion in 2026) estimated for 2016/17). Total subsidies to farmers in India is in the range of $45 billion to 50 billion, to the tune of 2%-2.5% of GDP. But per farmer the subsidy just about touches $48 in India, compared to over $7,000 in the U.S.

==== Armenia ====
Direct subsidies, of the Ministry of Agriculture, include subsidies for fertilizers, improved seed, agricultural chemicals, and fuel. The purpose of subsidies is to aid the smallest farmers in the sector. In particular, the maximum loan size for interest subsidies is minimal, and only farms with less than 3 ha are eligible for fuel, fertilizer, chemical, and seed subsidies. For loans of up to 3 million drams (about US$6,185 at current exchange rates), subsidies decrease interest rates from 10%–12% to 4%–6% in an effort to support Armenia's smaller farms.

== Impact of subsidies ==
=== Global food prices and international trade ===
Although some critics and proponents of the World Trade Organization have noted that export subsidies, by driving down the price of commodities, can provide cheap food for consumers in developing countries, low prices are harmful to farmers not receiving the subsidy. Because it is usually wealthy countries that can afford domestic subsidies, critics argue that they promote poverty in developing countries by artificially driving down world crop prices.

Generally, developing countries have a comparative advantage in producing agricultural goods, but low crop prices encourage developing countries to be dependent buyers of food from wealthy countries. So local farmers, instead of improving the agricultural and economic self-sufficiency of their home country, are forced out of the market and perhaps even off their land. This occurs as a result of a process known as "international dumping" in which subsidized farmers are able to "dump" low-cost agricultural goods on foreign markets at costs that un-subsidized farmers cannot compete with. Agricultural subsidies often are a common stumbling block in trade negotiations. In 2006, talks at the Doha round of WTO trade negotiations stalled because the US refused to cut subsidies to a level where other countries' non-subsidized exports would have been competitive.

Others argue that a world market with farm subsidies and other market distortions (as happens today) results in higher food prices, rather than lower food prices, as compared to a free market.

In 2002 Mark Malloch Brown, former head of the United Nations Development Programme, estimated that farm subsidies cost poor countries about US$50 billion a year in lost agricultural exports:

It is the extraordinary distortion of global trade, where the West spends $360 billion a year on protecting its agriculture with a network of subsidies and tariffs that costs developing countries about US$50 billion in potential lost agricultural exports. Fifty billion dollars is the equivalent of today's level of development assistance.

=== Poverty in developing countries ===
The impact of agricultural subsidies in developed countries upon developing-country farmers and international development is well documented. Agricultural subsidies can help drive prices down to benefit consumers, but also mean that unsubsidised developing-country farmers have a more difficult time competing in the world market; and the effects on poverty are particularly negative when subsidies are provided for crops that are also grown in developing countries since developing-country farmers must then compete directly with subsidised developed-country farmers, for example in cotton and sugar. The IFPRI has estimated in 2003 that the impact of subsidies costs developing countries $24 billion in lost incomes going to agricultural and agro-industrial production; and more than $40 billion is displaced from net agricultural exports. Moreover, the same study found that the least developed countries have a higher proportion of GDP dependent upon agriculture, at around 36.7%, thus may be even more vulnerable to the effects of subsidies. It has been argued that subsidised agriculture in the developed world is one of the greatest obstacles to economic growth in the developing world; which has an indirect impact on reducing the income available to invest in rural infrastructure such as health, safe water supplies and electricity for the rural poor. The total amount of subsidies that go towards agriculture in OECD countries far exceeds the amount that countries provide in development aid. In the case of Africa, it is estimated that a 1% increase in its total agricultural exports could lift its GDP by $70 billion, nearly five times what the region is provided in total foreign aid.

==== Haiti and US rice imports ====
Haiti is an excellent example of a developing country negatively affected by agricultural subsidies in the developed world. Haiti is a nation with the capacity to produce rice and was at one time self-sufficient in meeting its own needs. At present, Haiti does not produce enough to feed its people; 60 percent of the food consumed in the country is imported. Following advice to liberalize its economy by lowering tariffs, domestically produced rice was displaced by cheaper subsidized rice from the United States. The Food and Agriculture Organization describes this liberalization process as being the removal of barriers to trade and a simplification of tariffs, which lowers costs to consumers and promotes efficiency among producers.

Opening up Haiti's economy granted consumers access to food at a lower cost; allowing foreign producers to compete for the Haitian market drove down the price of rice. However, for Haitian rice farmers without access to subsidies, the downward pressure on prices led to a decline in profits. Subsidies received by American rice farmers, plus increased efficiencies, made it impossible for their Haitian counterparts to compete. According to Oxfam and the International Monetary Fund, tariffs on imports fell from 50 percent to three percent in 1995 and the nation is currently importing 80 percent of the rice it consumes.

The United States Department of Agriculture notes that since 1980, rice production in Haiti has been largely unchanged, while consumption on the other hand, is roughly eight times what it was in that same year. Haiti is among the top three consumers of long grain milled rice produced in the United States.

As rice farmers struggled to compete, many migrated from rural to urban areas in search of alternative economic opportunities.

=== Impact on nutrition ===
One peer-reviewed research suggests that any effects of US farm policies on US obesity patterns must have been negligible. However, some critics argue that the artificially low prices resulting from subsidies create unhealthy incentives for consumers. For example, in the US, cane sugar was replaced with cheap corn syrup, making high-sugar food cheaper; beet and cane sugar are subject to subsidies, price controls, and import tariffs that distort the prices of these products as well.

The lower price of energy-dense foods such as grains and sugars could be one reason why low-income people and food insecure people in industrialized countries are more vulnerable to being overweight and obese. According to the Physicians Committee for Responsible Medicine, meat and dairy production receive 63% of subsidies in the United States, as well as sugar subsidies for unhealthy foods, which contribute to heart disease, obesity and diabetes, with enormous costs for the health sector.

Market distortions due to subsidies have led to an increase in corn fed cattle rather than grass fed. Corn fed cattle require more antibiotics and their beef has a higher fat content.

=== Cross-border movement of businesses ===
Tariffs on sugar have also caused large candy makers in the US to relocate to Canada and Mexico, where sugar is often half to a third the price. The Dominican Republic Central America Free Trade Agreement (CAFTA), though, has had little impact in this area. The sugar issue causing alarm had reasoning due to what plausible effects could come through the tariffs as well as the undetermined future of these types of negotiations considering sugar importation in the United States. Due to various continuing disputes in trade, Mexico began to have fewer exports of sugar into the United States, where the North American Free Trade Agreement (NAFTA) allowed. Those who left and sought out other companies for sugar have leaned marginally more towards Canada than Mexico. The tariffs are what keeps the large pressure from competition from south of the Rio Grande at bay.

=== Non-farming companies ===
Subsidies are also given to companies and individuals with little connection to traditional farming. It has been reported that the largest part of the sum given to these companies flow to multinational companies like food conglomerates, sugar manufacturers and liquor distillers. For example, in France, the single largest beneficiary was the chicken processor Groupe Doux, at €62.8m, and was followed by about a dozen sugar manufacturers which together reaped more than €103m.

=== Public economics implications ===
Government intervention, through agricultural subsidies, interferes with the price mechanism which would normally determine commodity prices, often creating crop overproduction and market discrimination.

Journalist Michael Pollan argues that corn became a prime crop for over-production (and thus subsidies) due to it having a wide genetic variability and flexibility; historical uses of corn as food and as a commodity fueled its growth with capitalism. As a result of overproduction and falling prices, farmers were subsidized with direct payments from the government. The pressure to produce massive swaths of corn, however, resulted in farmers tending to monocrop agriculture. As Pollan argues, this not only pushed many small farms out of business, but also resulted in paradoxical "food deserts".

Subsidies are also an inefficient use of taxpayer's money. For instance, in 2006, the Department of Agriculture estimated that the average farm household income was $77,654 or about 17% higher than the average US household income. From a public economics perspective, subsidies of any kind work to create a socially and politically acceptable equilibrium that is not necessarily Pareto efficient.

=== Environmental implications ===
A study by the UN Food and Agriculture Organization found 87% of the $540bn farmers given every year between 2013 and 2018 in global subsidies are harmful to both people and environment. The monoculture system associated with subsidized large-scale production has been implicated as a contributory factor in Colony Collapse Disorder which has affected bee populations. Bee pollination is an essential ecosystem service essential for the production of many varieties of fruits and vegetables. Subsidies often go towards subsidising meat production which has other nutritional and environmental implications; and it has been found that out of the $200Bn subsidies to subsidise crops from 1995 to 2010 around two-thirds of this went to animal feed, tobacco and cotton production. On the other hand, farmers producing fruits and vegetables received no direct subsidies. The environmental impact of meat production is high due to the resource and energy requirements that go into production of feed for livestock throughout their lifespan, for example, a kilogram of beef uses about 60 times as much water as an equivalent amount of potato. The subsidies contribute to meat consumption by allowing for an artificially low cost of meat products.

== Alternatives ==
Liberals argue that subsidies distort incentives for the global trade of agricultural commodities in which other countries may have a comparative advantage. Allowing countries to specialize in commodities where they have a comparative advantage and then freely trade across borders would therefore increase global welfare and reduce food prices. Ending direct payments to farmers and deregulating the farm industry would eliminate inefficiencies and deadweight loss created by government intervention.

However, others disagree, arguing that a more radical transformation of agriculture is needed, one guided by the notion that ecological change in agriculture cannot be promoted without comparable changes in the social, political, cultural and economic arenas that conform and determine agriculture. The organized peasant and indigenous based agrarian movements, e.g. Via Campesina, take action by arguing that only by changing the export-led, free-trade based, industrial agriculture model of large farms can halt what they call the downward spiral of poverty, low wages, rural-urban migration, hunger and environmental degradation.

== See also ==
- Protectionism
- Free trade
- Agricultural policy
- Price support
- Farm gate value
- 2007–2008 world food price crisis
- Electrical energy efficiency on United States farms
