= Poultry farming =

Part of animal husbandry

Chicken meat production

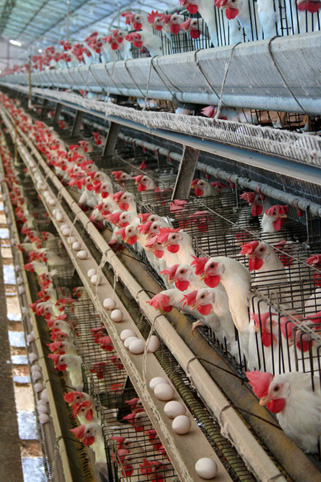
Bank of cages for layer hens

Poultry farming is the form of animal husbandry which breeds domesticated birds including chickens, ducks, turkeys and geese to produce meat or eggs for food. Poultry – mostly chickens – are farmed in great numbers. More than 60 billion chickens are killed for consumption annually. Chickens used for meat are known as broilers, while chickens used for eggs are called layers — though they are usually also killed for their meat.

In the United States, the national organization overseeing poultry production is the Food and Drug Administration (FDA). In the UK, the national organization is the Department for Environment, Food and Rural Affairs (DEFRA).

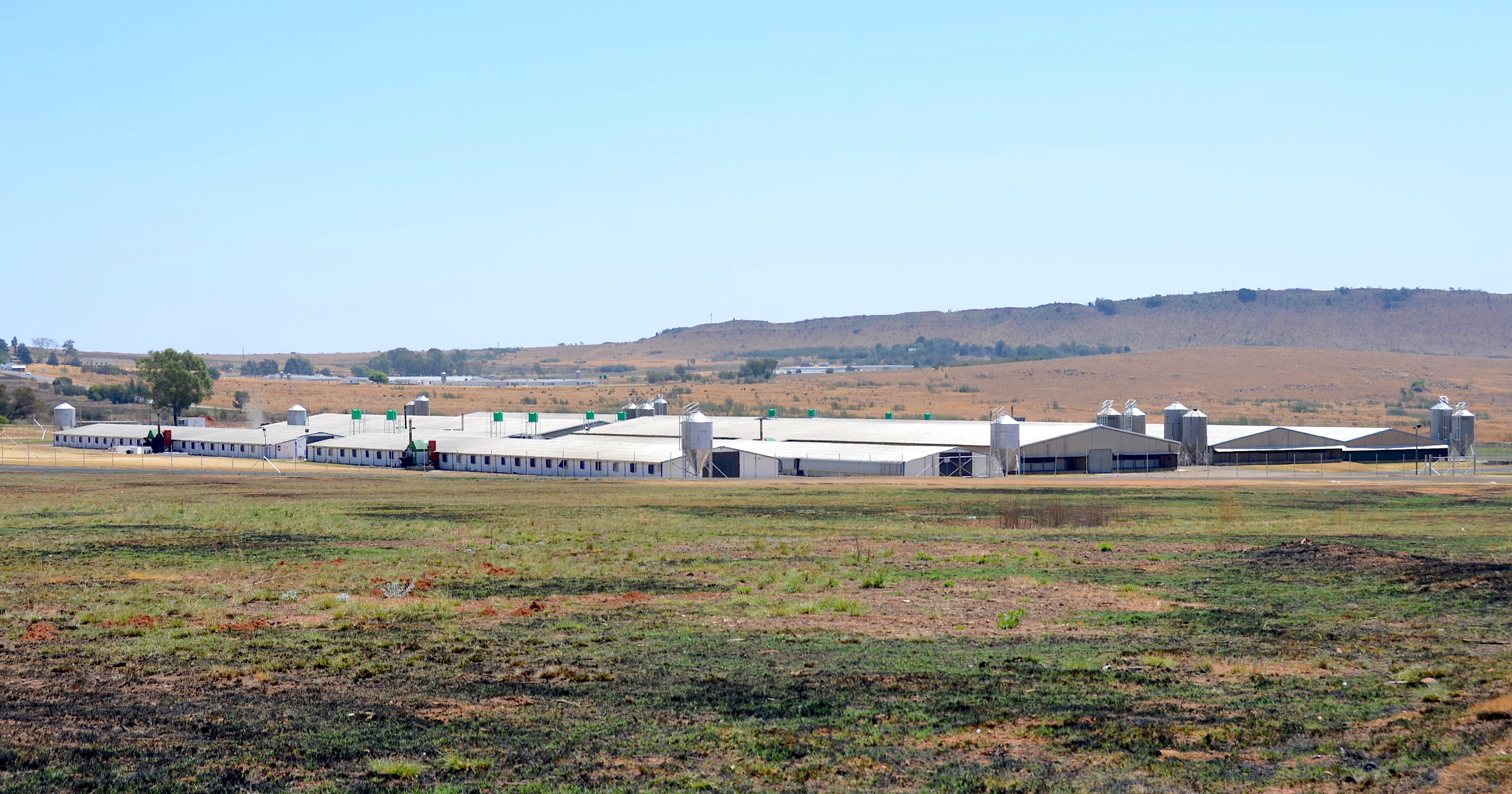
Poultry farm in South Africa, showing black terrain in foreground after controlled burn to stimulate new growth of nutritious grass

== Intensive and alternative ==
Biomass of birds on Earth
1. Chicken and other poultry (70.0%)
2. Wild birds (30.0%)

According to the World Watch Institute, 74 percent of the world's poultry meat, and 68 percent of eggs are produced intensively. One alternative to intensive poultry farming is free-range farming using lower stocking densities. Poultry producers routinely use nationally approved medications, such as antibiotics, in feed or drinking water, to treat disease or to prevent disease outbreaks. Some FDA-approved medications are also approved for improved feed utilization.

Poultry livestock count

Poultry production tonnes

Poultry yields meat per animal

== Chicken coop ==
A chicken coop or hen house is a structure where chickens or other fowl are kept safe and secure. There may be nest boxes and perches in the house. There is a long-standing controversy over the basic need for a chicken coop. One philosophy, known as the "fresh air school", holds that chickens are mostly hardy but can be brought low by confinement, poor air quality and darkness, hence the need for a highly ventilated or open-sided coop with conditions more like the outdoors, even in winter. However, others who keep chickens believe they are prone to illness in outdoor weather and need a controlled-environment coop. This has led to two housing designs for chickens: fresh-air houses with wide openings and nothing more than wire mesh between chickens and the weather (even in Northern winters), or closed houses with doors, windows and hatches which can shut off most ventilation.

== Egg-laying chickens ==
An agricultural worker holding an egg-laying hen, 1944

Commercial hens usually begin laying eggs at 16–21 weeks of age, although production gradually declines from approximately 25 weeks of age. This means that in many countries, by approximately 72 weeks of age, flocks are considered economically unviable and are slaughtered after approximately 12 months of egg production, although chickens will naturally live for 6 or more years. In some countries, hens are force moulted to re-invigorate egg-laying.

Environmental conditions are often automatically controlled in egg-laying systems. For example, the duration of the light phase is initially increased to prompt the beginning of egg-laying at 16–20 weeks of age and then mimics summer day length which stimulates the hens to continue laying eggs all year round; normally, egg production occurs only in the warmer months. Some commercial breeds of hen can produce over 300 eggs a year.

=== Free-range ===
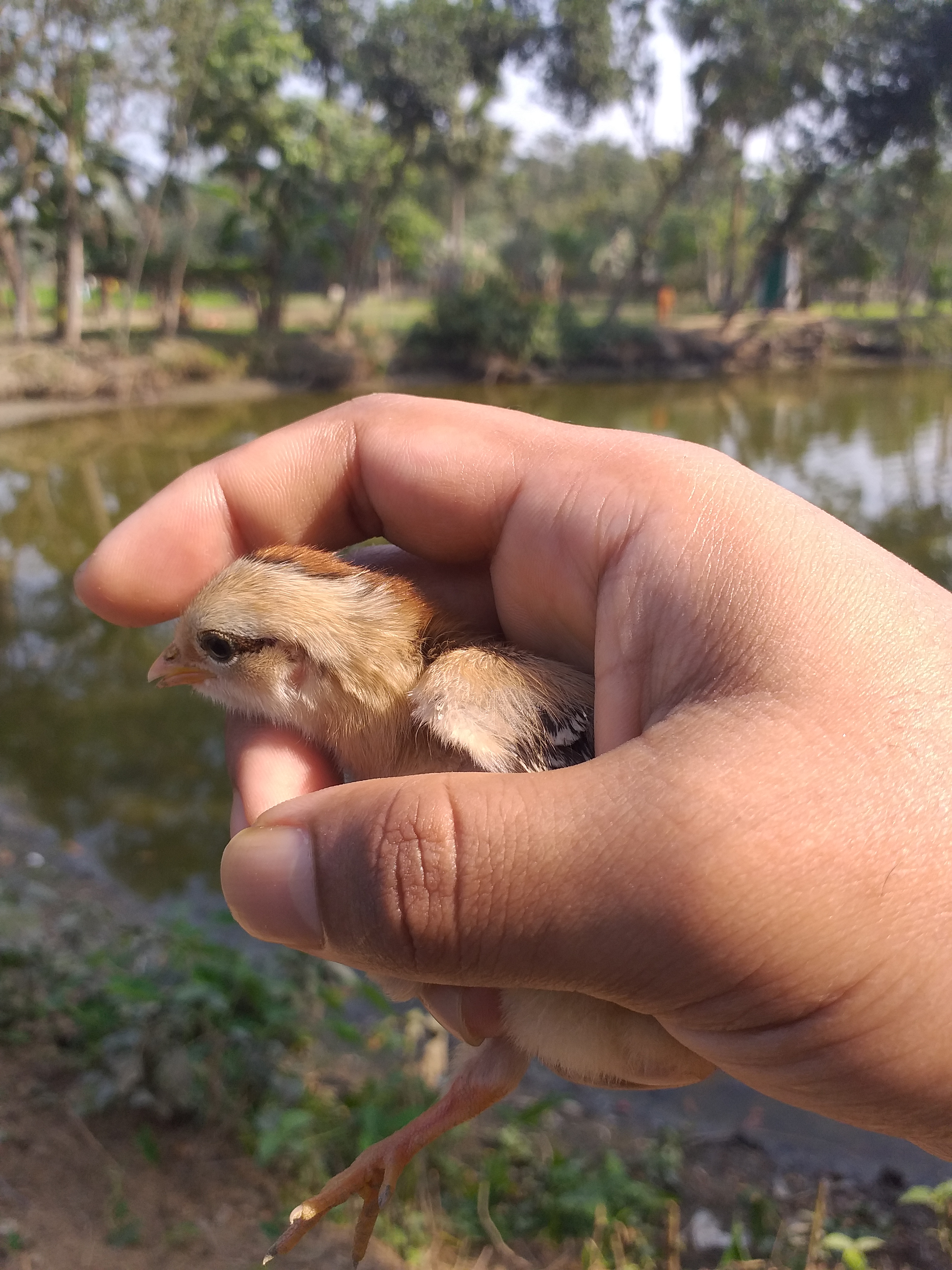
Baby free-range chicken in Ishwarganj Upazila, Mymensingh, Bangladesh

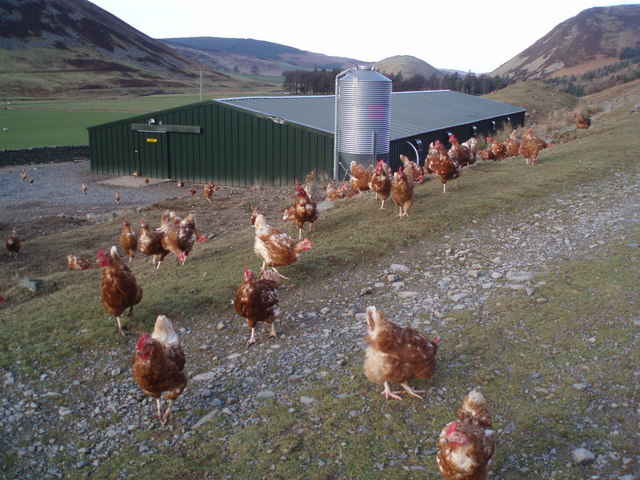
Commercial free range hens in the Scottish Borders

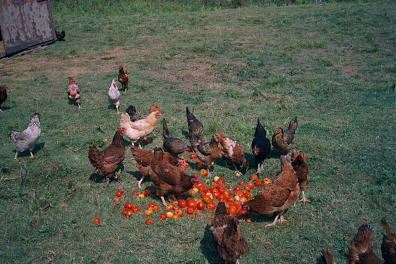
Free-range chickens being fed outdoors

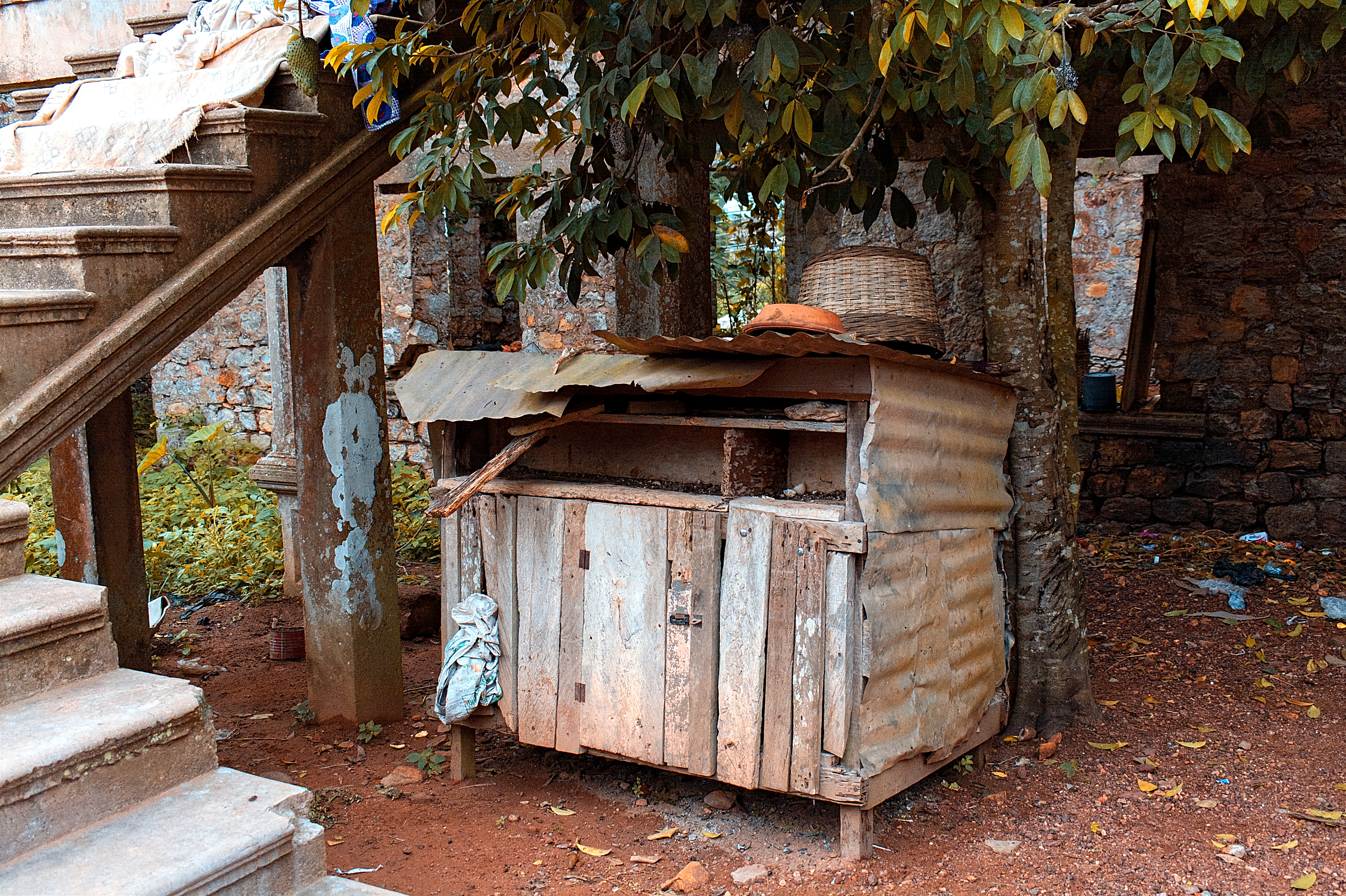
Chicken coop in Ghana

Free-range poultry farming allows chickens to roam freely for a period of the day, although they are usually confined in sheds at night to protect them from predators or kept indoors if the weather is particularly bad. In the UK, the Department for Environment, Food and Rural Affairs (DEFRA) states that a free-range chicken must have day-time access to open-air runs during at least half of its life. Unlike in the United States, this definition also applies to free-range egg-laying hens, meaning they can still be confined in high stocking densities with limited outdoors access. The European Union regulates marketing standards for egg farming, which specify a minimum condition for free-range eggs, including that "hens have continuous daytime access to open air runs, except in the case of temporary restrictions imposed by veterinary authorities". The RSPCA "Welfare standards for laying hens and pullets" indicates that the stocking rate must not exceed 1,000 birds per hectare (10 m^{2} per hen) of range available and a minimum area of overhead shade/shelter of 8 m^{2} per 1,000 hens must be provided.

Free-range farming of egg-laying hens is increasing its share of the market. DEFRA figures indicate that 45% of eggs produced in the UK throughout 2010 were free range, 5% were produced in barn systems and 50% from cages. This compares with 41% being free range in 2009.

Suitable land requires adequate drainage to minimise worms and coccidial oocysts, suitable protection from prevailing winds, good ventilation, access and protection from predators. Excess heat, cold or damp can have a harmful effect on the animals and their productivity. Free range farmers have less control than farmers using cages in what food their chickens eat, which can lead to unreliable productivity, though supplementary feeding reduces this uncertainty.

The benefits of free-range poultry farming for laying hens include opportunities for natural behaviours such as pecking, scratching, foraging and exercise outdoors. In some farms, the manure from free range poultry can be used to benefit crops.

Both intensive free-range poultry and "cage-free" farming with hens still being confined in close proximity due to high stocking densities have animal welfare concerns. Cannibalism, feather pecking and vent pecking can be common, prompting some farmers to use beak trimming as a preventative measure, although reducing stocking rates would eliminate these problems. Diseases can be common and the animals are vulnerable to predators. Barn systems have been found to have the worst bird welfare. In South-East Asia, a lack of disease control in free range farming has been associated with outbreaks of avian influenza.

==== Free-run ====
Instead of keeping them in cages, free-run laying hens roam freely within an enclosed barn. This type of housing also provides enrichment for the hens, including nesting boxes and perches that are often located along the floor of the barn. Many believe that this type of housing is better for the bird than any caging system, but it has its disadvantages, too. Due to the increase in activity of the birds, dust levels tend to elevate and the air quality decreases. When air quality drops, so does production as this compromises the health and welfare of both birds and their caretakers.

==== Organic ====
In organic systems in the US, organic management starts with the selection of the livestock and should begin "no later than the second day of life". Organic poultry production requires organic management in nutrition, preventative health care, living conditions, handling/processing, and record keeping. The Soil Association standards used to certify organic flocks in the UK indicate a maximum outdoors stocking density of 1,000 birds per hectare and a maximum of 2,000 hens in each poultry house. In the UK, organic laying hens are not routinely beak-trimmed.

=== Yarding ===
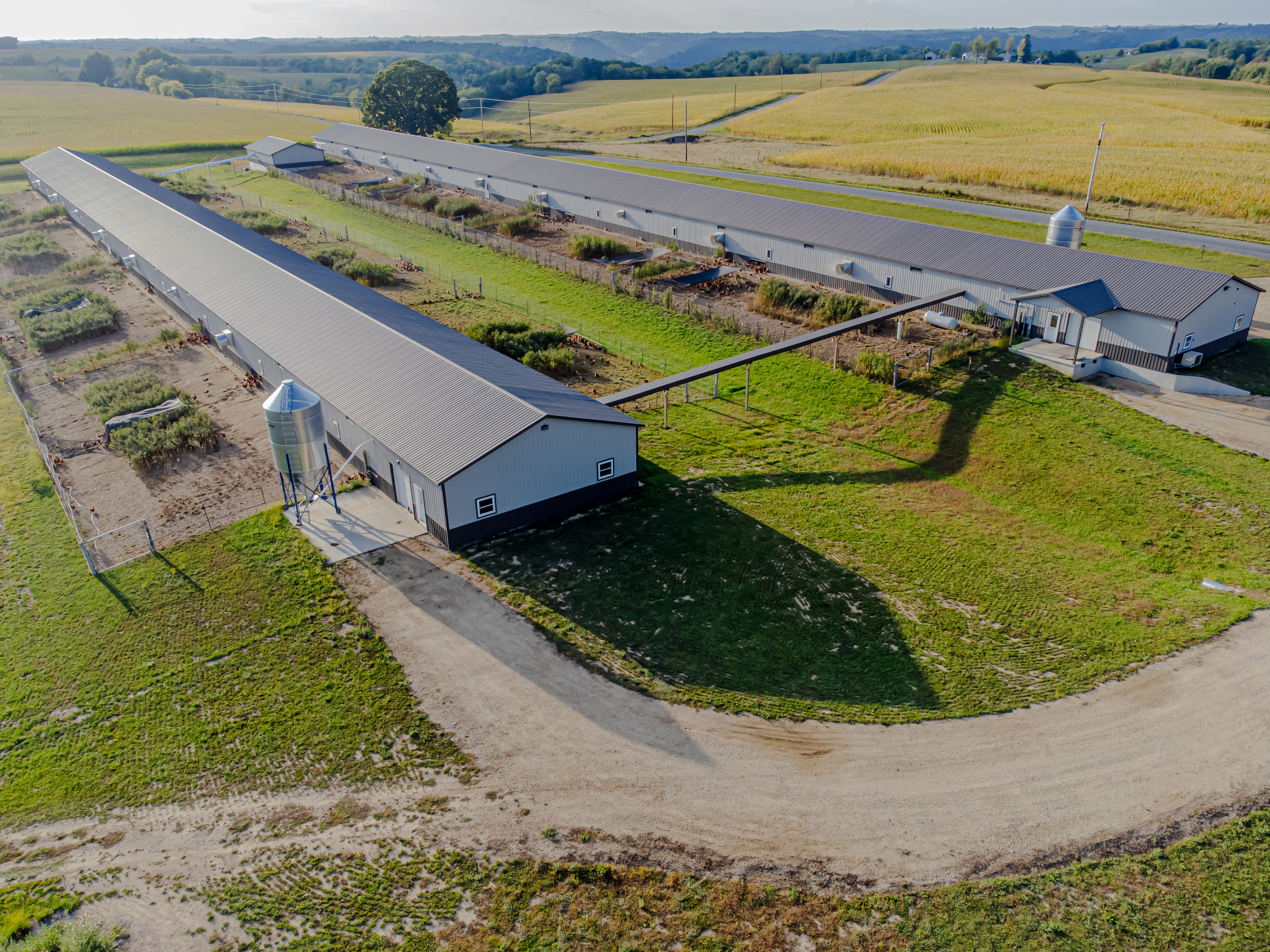
Yarding poultry farm

While often confused with free range farming, yarding is actually a separate method by which a hutch and fenced-off area outside are combined when farming poultry. The distinction is that free-range poultry are either totally unfenced, or the fence is so distant that it has little influence on their freedom of movement. Yarding is a common technique used by small farms in the Northeastern U.S. The birds are released daily from hutches or coops. The hens usually lay eggs either on the floor of the coop or in baskets if provided by the farmer. This husbandry technique can be complicated if used with roosters, mostly because of their aggressive behavior.

=== Battery cage ===
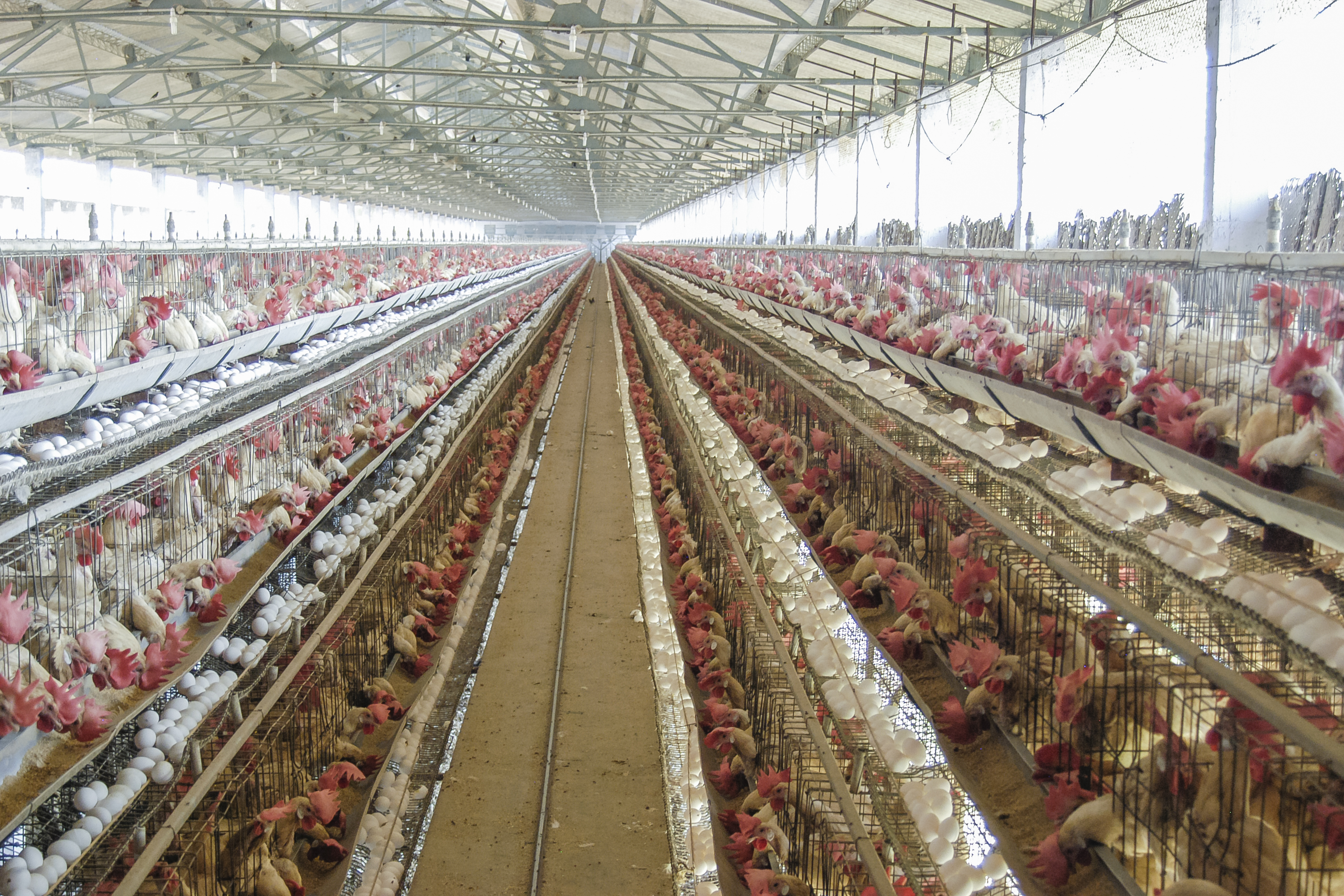
Poultry farm using battery cages in India

The majority of hens in many countries are housed in battery cages, although the European Union Council Directive 1999/74/EC has banned the conventional battery cage in EU states from January 2012. As of April 1, 2017, no new battery cages are able to be installed in Canada. Farmers must move towards enriched housing or use a cage-free system. In 2016, the Egg Farmers of Canada announced that the country's egg farmers will be transitioning away from conventional hen housing systems (battery cages) and have no conventional caging left by 2036. Batteries are small cages, usually made of metal in modern systems, housing 3 to 8 hens. The walls are made of either solid metal or mesh, and the floor is sloped wire mesh to allow the feces to drop through and eggs to roll onto an egg-collecting conveyor belt. Water is usually provided by overhead nipple systems, and food in a trough along the front of the cage replenished at regular intervals by a mechanical system.

Battery cages are arranged in long rows as multiple tiers, often with cages back-to-back (hence the term). Within a single barn, there may be several floors containing battery cages meaning that a single shed may contain many tens of thousands of hens. Light intensity is often kept low (e.g. 10 lux) to reduce feather pecking and vent pecking. Benefits of battery cages include easier care for the birds, floor-laid eggs (which are expensive to collect) are eliminated, eggs are cleaner, capture at the end of lay is expedited, generally less feed is required to produce eggs, broodiness is eliminated, more hens may be housed in a given house floor space, internal parasites are more easily treated, and labor requirements are generally much reduced.

In farms using cages for egg production, there are more birds per unit area; this allows for greater productivity and lower food costs. Floor space ranges upwards from 300 cm^{2} per hen. EU standards in 2003 called for at least 550 cm^{2} per hen. In the US, the current recommendation by the United Egg Producers is 67 to 86 in^{2} (430 to 560 cm^{2}) per bird. The space available to battery hens has often been described as less than the size of a piece of A4 paper (623 cm^{2}). Animal welfare scientists have been critical of battery cages because they do not provide hens with sufficient space to stand, walk, flap their wings, perch, or make a nest, and it is widely considered that hens suffer through boredom and frustration through being unable to perform these behaviours. This can lead to a wide range of abnormal behaviours, some of which are injurious to the hens or their cagemates.

=== Furnished cage ===
In 1999, the European Union Council Directive 1999/74/EC banned conventional battery cages for laying hens throughout the European Union from January 1, 2012; they were banned previously in other countries including Switzerland. In response to these bans, development of prototype commercial furnished cage systems began in the 1980s. Furnished cages, sometimes called 'enriched' or 'modified' cages, are cages for egg-laying hens which have been designed to allow the hens to perform their "natural behaviors" whilst retaining their economic and husbandry advantages, and also provide some of the welfare advantages of non-cage systems. Many design features of furnished cages have been incorporated because research in animal welfare science has shown them to be of benefit to the hens. In the UK, the DEFRA "Code for the Welfare of Laying Hens" states furnished cages should provide at least 750 cm^{2} of cage area per hen, 600 cm^{2} of which should be usable; the height of the cage other than that above the usable area should be at least 20 cm at every point and no cage should have a total area that is less than 2000 cm^{2}.

In addition, furnished cages should provide a nest, litter such that pecking and scratching are possible, appropriate perches allowing at least 15 cm per hen, a claw-shortening device, and a feed trough which may be used without restriction providing 12 cm per hen. Furnished cages (Enriched) give the hens more space than the conventional battery cages, so that each bird may spread their wings without touching one another if desired. Enrichment such as nest boxes, perches, and dust baths are also provided so that the birds may carry out their natural behaviors such as nesting, roosting, and scratching as though they were outdoors.

Enrichment of laying hen cages ultimately results in better bone quality. This is a result of the increased activity in the hens from the additional space and enrichment provided in the furnished housing system.

Although the enriched housing system has advantages such as reduced aggression towards one another and cleaner eggs, modern egg-laying breeds often suffer from osteoporosis, which results in weakened skeletal systems. During egg production, large amounts of calcium are transferred from bones to create egg-shell. Although dietary calcium levels are adequate, absorption of dietary calcium is not always sufficient, given the intensity of production, to fully replenish bone calcium. This can lead to increases in bone breakages, particularly when the hens are being removed from cages at the end of laying. Osteoporosis may be prevented by free range and cage-free housing systems, as they have shown to have a beneficial impact on the skeletal system of the hens compared to those housed in caged systems.

Countries such as Austria, Belgium and Germany are planning to ban furnished cages until 2025 additionally to the already banned conventional cages.

=== Urban chicken keeping ===
Raising chickens in urban or suburban environments is experiencing a resurgence in popularity in many countries including the United States. Proponents of this practice cite benefits such as access to fresh eggs, natural pest control, educational opportunities, and a connection to sustainable food practices.

While commercial operations typically use leghorn chickens, many other breeds such as the Bantam are well-suited for urban settings.

The practice faces legal and regulatory hurdles; many cities have specific ordinances regarding the number of chickens allowed, coop size, and potential noise and odor issues.

Concerns surrounding predation from wild carnivores such as raccoons, heavy metal exposure, potential reduction in property values, Salmonella, avian flu, animal welfare, and potential conflicts with neighbors also exist.

Despite these challenges, urban chicken keeping continues to gain traction as a part of the broader local food movement and a way for individuals to increase their self-sufficiency.

== Meat-producing chickens – husbandry systems ==
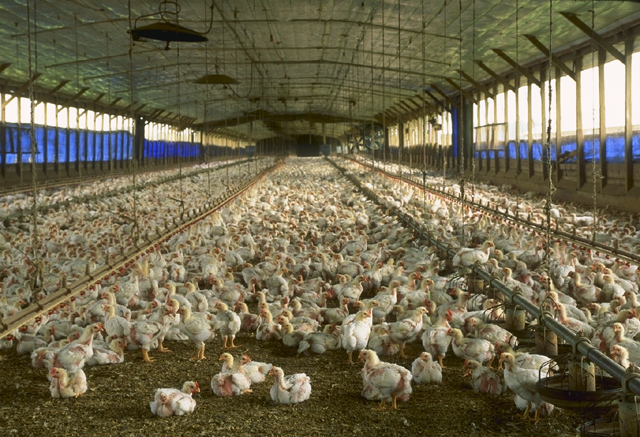
Broilers in a production house

=== Indoor broilers ===
Meat chickens, commonly called broilers, are floor-raised on litter such as wood shavings, peanut shells, and rice hulls, indoors in climate-controlled housing. Under modern farming methods, meat chickens reared indoors reach slaughter weight at 5 to 9 weeks of age, as they have been selectively bred to do so. In the first week of a broiler's life, it can grow up to 300 percent of its body size. A nine-week-old broiler averages over 9 pounds (4 kg) in body weight. At nine weeks, a hen will average around 7 pounds (3.2 kg) and a rooster will weigh around 12 pounds (5.5 kg), having a nine-pound (4 kg) average.

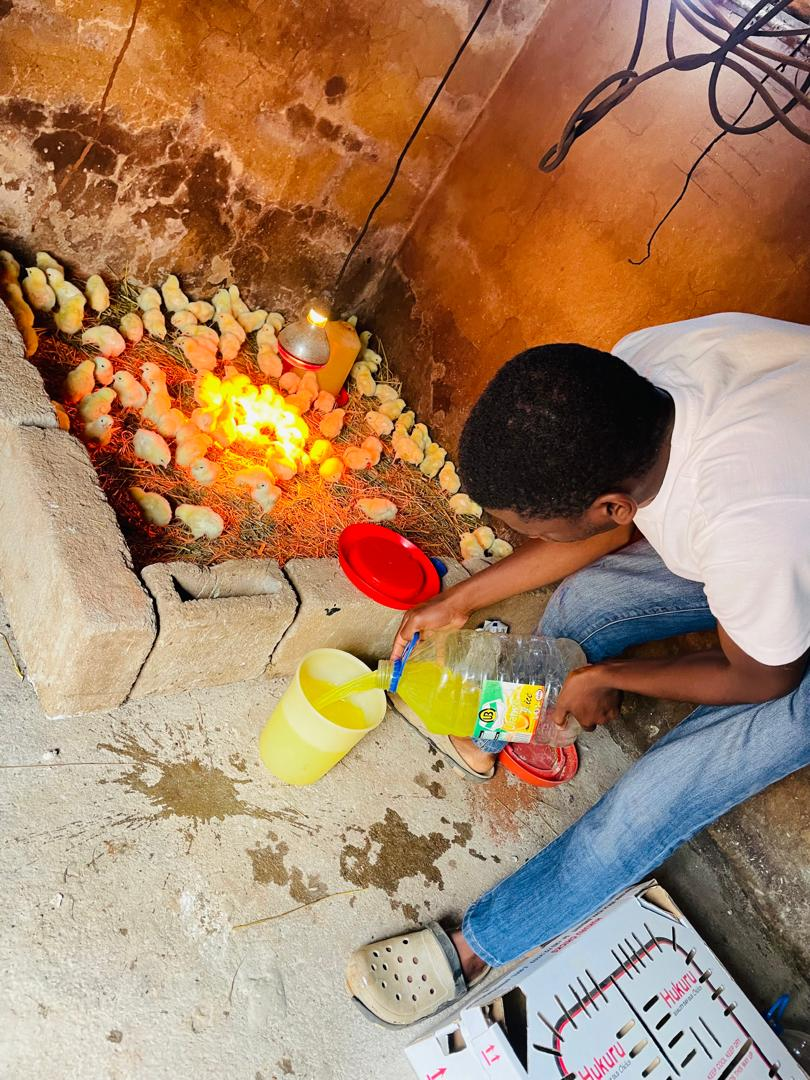
Day old chicks about to drink stress pack

Broilers are not raised in cages. They are raised in large, open structures known as grow out houses. A farmer receives the birds from the hatchery at one day old. A grow out consists of 5 to 9 weeks according to how big the kill plant wants the chickens to be. These houses are equipped with mechanical systems to deliver feed and water to the birds. They have ventilation systems and heaters that function as needed. The floor of the house is covered with bedding material consisting of wood chips, rice hulls, or peanut shells. In some cases they can be grown over dry litter or compost. Because dry bedding helps maintain flock health, most growout houses have enclosed watering systems ("nipple drinkers") which reduce spillage.

Keeping birds inside a house protects them from predators such as hawks and foxes. Some houses are equipped with curtain walls, which can be rolled up in good weather to admit natural light and fresh air. Most growout houses built in recent years feature "tunnel ventilation," in which a bank of fans draws fresh air through the house.

Traditionally, a flock of broilers consist of about 20,000 birds in a growout house that measures 400/500 feet long and 40/50 feet wide, thus providing about eight-tenths of a square foot per bird. The Council for Agricultural Science and Technology (CAST) states that the minimum space is one-half square foot per bird. More modern houses are often larger and contain more birds, but the floor space allotment still meets the needs of the birds. The larger the bird is grown the fewer chickens are put in each house, to give the bigger bird more space per square foot.

Because broilers are relatively young and have not reached sexual maturity, they exhibit very little aggressive conduct.

Chicken feed consists primarily of corn and soybean meal with the addition of essential vitamins and minerals. No hormones or steroids are allowed in raising chickens.

==== Issues with indoor husbandry ====
In intensive broiler sheds, the air can become highly polluted with ammonia from the droppings. In this case, a farmer must run more fans to bring in more clean fresh air. If not, this can damage the chickens' eyes and respiratory systems and can cause painful burns on their legs (called hock burns) as well as blisters on their feet. Broilers bred for fast growth have a high rate of developing leg deformities because their large breast muscles cause distortions on their developing legs and pelvis, leading to them often being unable to support their body weight. In cases where the chickens become crippled and can no longer walk, farmers have to go in and pull them out. Because of their difficulty moving, the chickens cannot change their environment to avoid heat, cold, or dirt as they would in natural conditions. The added weight and overcrowding also puts a strain on their hearts and lungs, possibly leading to Ascites. In the UK, up to 19 million broilers die in their sheds from heart failure each year. In a heat wave, if a power failure shuts down the ventilation, 20,000 chickens could die in a short period of time. In a good grow out, a farmer should sell between 92% and 96% of their flock, with a 1.80 to a 2.0 feed conversion ratio. After marketing the birds, the farmer must clean out and prepare for another flock. A farmer should average 4 to 5 grow outs a year.

==== Indoor with higher welfare ====
In a "higher welfare" system, chickens are kept indoors but with more space (around 14 to 16 birds per square metre). They have a richer environment for example with natural light or straw bales that encourage foraging and perching. The chickens grow more slowly and live for up to two weeks longer than intensively farmed birds. The benefits of higher welfare indoor systems are the reduced growth rate, less crowding and more opportunities for natural behaviour. One example of indoor production with higher welfare production is the Better Chicken Commitment standard.

=== Free-range broilers ===
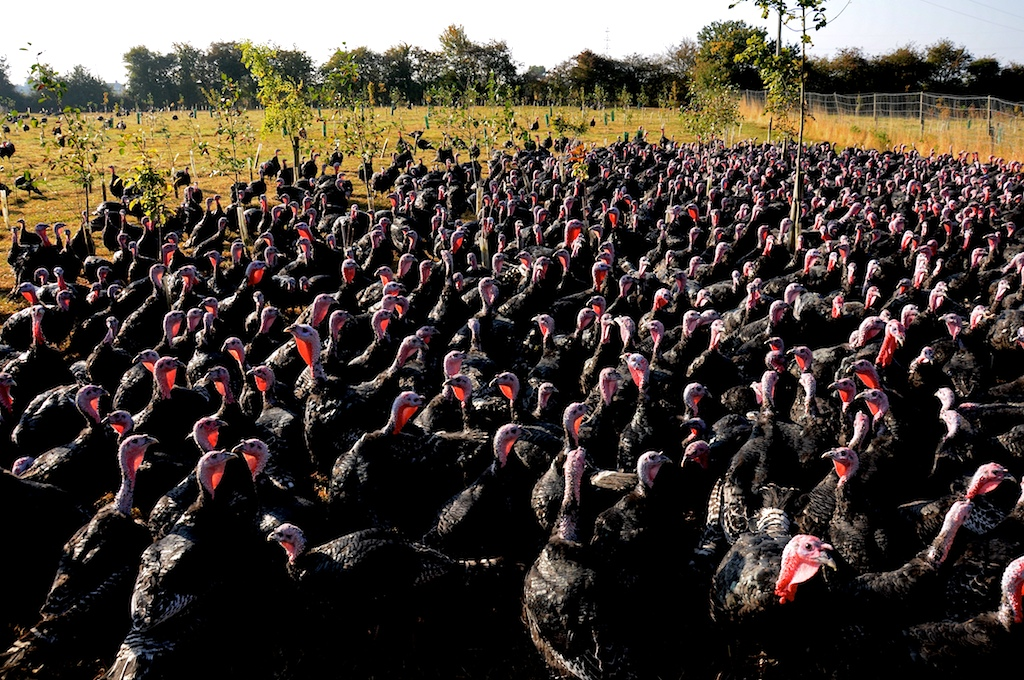
Turkeys on pasture at an organic farm

Free-range broilers are reared under similar conditions to free-range egg-laying hens. The breeds grow more slowly than those used for indoor rearing and usually reach slaughter weight at approximately 8 weeks of age. In the EU, each chicken must have one square metre of outdoor space. The benefits of free-range poultry farming include opportunities for natural behaviours such as pecking, scratching, foraging and exercise outdoors. Because they grow slower and have opportunities for exercise, free-range broilers often have better leg and heart health.

=== Organic broilers ===
Organic broiler chickens are reared under similar conditions to free-range broilers but with restrictions on the routine use of in-feed or in-water medications, other food additives and synthetic amino acids. The breeds used are slower growing, more traditional breeds and typically reach slaughter weight at around 12 weeks of age. They have a larger space allowance outside (at least 2 square metres and sometimes up to 10 square metres per bird). The Soil Association standards indicate a maximum outdoors stocking density of 2,500 birds per hectare and a maximum of 1,000 broilers per poultry house.

== Dual-purpose chicken ==
A dual-purpose chicken is a type of chicken that may be used in the production of both eggs and meat. In the past, many chicken breeds were selected for both functions. However, since the advent of laying and meat hybrids, industrial chicken breeding has made a sharp distinction between chickens with either function, so that certain characteristics have been promoted to an extreme degree. Partly due to the discussion about male offspring of laying hens that are not economically viable and are usually gassed or ground alive as day-old chicks, a discussion is currently underway as to whether dual-purpose chickens have a future role on a large or smaller scale.

Historically, the distinction between egg and meat production did not exist. It only appeared with the development of industrial farming and the breeder's specialization (including day-old chicks). Modern laying breeds have become unable to provide enough meat to satisfy consumers accustomed to breeds selected for fattening, which are poor layers and brooders.

In addition, the strategies for killing livestock affected by avian influenza or highly pathogenic diseases or with significant epidemiological or eco-epidemiological risks have led in a large number of family backyards to replace old mixed varieties with laying poultry or modern meat dishes.

Faced with the criticism leveled at industrial farming (in particular concerning the killing of millions of chicks by gassing (with CO_{2}) or even in certain cases denounced by the media by grinding live chicks, asphyxiation in plastic bags (when the animals are not buried alive or simply thrown in a dumpster), the concept of dual use is one of the possible answers, and as such supported by the Demeter network in Germany. In Switzerland, where two million chicks of hybrid laying breed are put to death every year (according to Oswald Burch, director of GalloSuisse, on SRF1 radio), these animals killed almost at birth are sold as food for animals in zoos or animal stores, or are transformed into biogas.

Another solution would be to analyze the sex of the embryo or fetus in the egg before the incubation phase (when the egg is still consumable) and to eliminate it from the breeding circuit to direct it to the egg sales circuit (Eggs that have not yet been incubated and fertilized can be consumed during the first days after laying, recalls Ruedi Zweifel, director of the Aviforum foundation, the competence center of the Swiss poultry farming). The universities of Leipzig and Dresden are testing ways to achieve this, but have not yet found any that are applicable in real time on an industrial scale.

The German company Lohmann is one of the first to have integrated this concept on a large scale, as part of its collaboration with the agricultural association Déméter. It produced its own poultry by crossing lines presenting the sought-after characteristics, which is a way to solve the problem of killing male chicks.

The dual-purpose chicken selected by the Lohmann group, the "Lohmann Dual", is raised in Switzerland by a few breeders, and the Coop network decided to launch the experiment with a test on 5,000 poultry, although knowing that instead of producing up to 300 eggs per year like very good laying hens, it will only produce around 250 eggs per year, which are also smaller according to the journal of the Swiss Poultry Organization. If the consumer accepts higher prices in exchange for better consideration of the animal cause, then a sector could be launched. Concerning meat, Coop spokesperson Ramon Gander estimated that the demand was there and according to him "the meat has also convinced tasters".

== Issues ==
=== Inhumane treatment ===
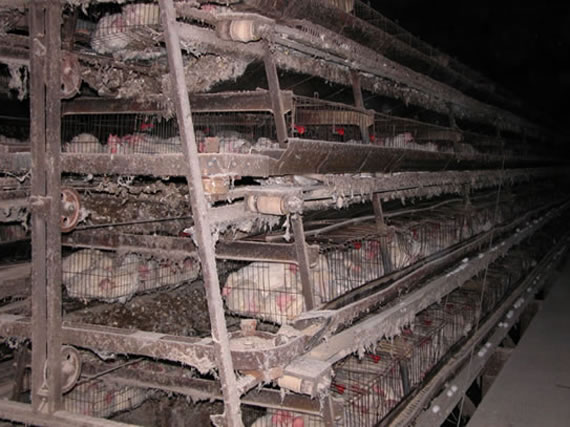
Battery cages

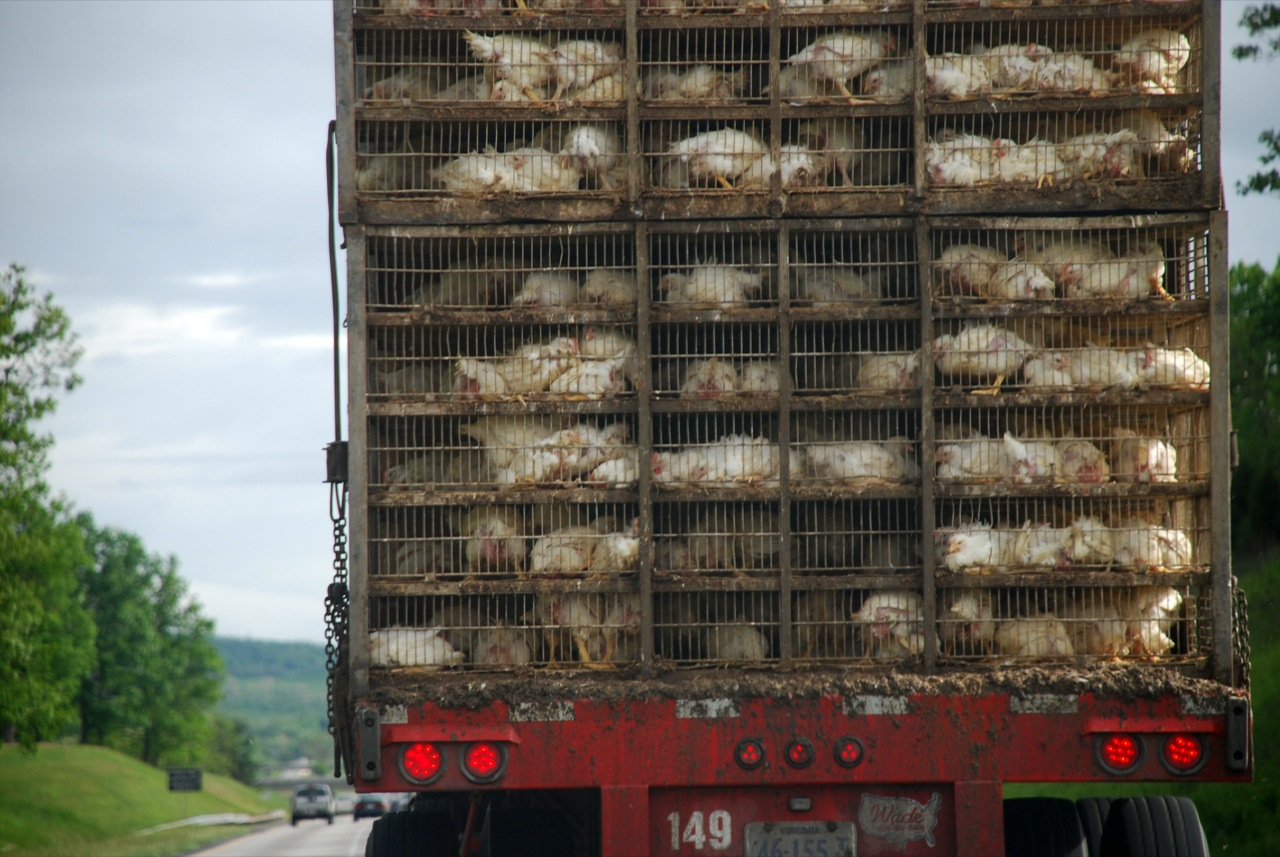
Chickens transported in a truck

Animal welfare groups have frequently criticized the poultry industry for engaging in practices which they assert to be inhumane. Many animal rights advocates object to killing chickens for food, the "factory farm conditions" under which they are raised, methods of transport, and slaughter. Animal Outlook (formerly Compassion Over Killing) and other groups have repeatedly conducted undercover investigations at chicken farms and slaughterhouses which they allege confirm their claims of cruelty.

A common practice among hatcheries for egg-laying hens is the culling of newly hatched male chicks since they do not lay eggs and do not grow fast enough to be profitable for meat. There are plans to more ethically destroy the eggs before the chicks are hatched, using "in-ovo" sex determination.

Chickens are often stunned before slaughter using carbon dioxide or electric shock in a water bath. Methods claimed to be more humane that could be used are low atmospheric pressure stunning and inert gas asphyxiation.

According to animal charities, carrying chickens by their legs is inhumane. The European Commission advocates for this practice, and the UK government is intending to legalize it.

=== Beak trimming ===
Laying hens are routinely beak-trimmed at 1 day of age to reduce the damaging effects of aggression, feather pecking and cannibalism. Scientific studies have shown that beak trimming is likely to cause both acute and chronic pain. Severe beak trimming, or beak trimming birds at an older age, may cause chronic pain. Following beak trimming of older or adult hens, the nociceptors in the beak stump show abnormal patterns of neural discharge, indicating acute pain.

Neuromas, tangled masses of swollen regenerating axon sprouts, are found in the healed stumps of birds beak trimmed at 5 weeks of age or older and in severely beak trimmed birds. Neuromas have been associated with phantom pain in human amputees and have therefore been linked to chronic pain in beak trimmed birds. If beak trimming is severe because of improper procedure or done in older birds, the neuromas will persist which suggests that beak trimmed older birds experience chronic pain, although this has been debated.

Beak-trimmed chicks initially peck less than non-trimmed chickens, which animal behaviorist Temple Grandin attributes to guarding against pain. The animal rights activist, Peter Singer, claims this procedure is bad because beaks are sensitive, and the usual practice of trimming them without anaesthesia is considered inhumane by some. Some within the chicken industry claim that beak-trimming is not painful whereas others argue that the procedure causes chronic pain and discomfort, and decreases the ability to eat or drink.

=== Antibiotics ===
Antibiotics have been used in poultry farming in mass quantities since 1951, when the Food and Drug Administration (FDA) approved their use. Scientists had found that chickens fed an antibiotic residue grew 50 percent faster than controls. The chickens laid more eggs and experienced lower mortality and less illness. Upon this discovery, farmers transitioned from expensive animal proteins to comparatively inexpensive antibiotics and B12. Chickens were now reaching their market weight at a much faster rate and at a lower cost. With a growing population and greater demand on the farmers, antibiotics appeared to be an ideal and cost-effective way to increase the output of poultry. Since this discovery, antibiotics have been routinely used in poultry production, but more recently have been the topic of debate secondary to the fear of bacterial antibiotic resistance.

=== Arsenic ===
Poultry feed can include roxarsone or nitarsone, arsenical antimicrobial drugs that also promote growth. Roxarsone was used as a broiler starter by about 70% of the broiler growers between 1995 and 2000. The drugs have generated controversy because they contain arsenic, which is highly toxic to humans. This arsenic could be transmitted through run-off from the poultry yards. A 2004 study by the U.S. magazine Consumer Reports reported "no detectable arsenic in our samples of muscle" but found "A few of our chicken-liver samples has an amount that according to EPA standards could cause neurological problems in a child who ate 2 ounces of cooked liver per week or in an adult who ate 5.5 ounces per week." The U.S. Food and Drug Administration (FDA), however, is the organization responsible for the regulation of foods in America, and all samples tested were "far less than the ... amount allowed in a food product."

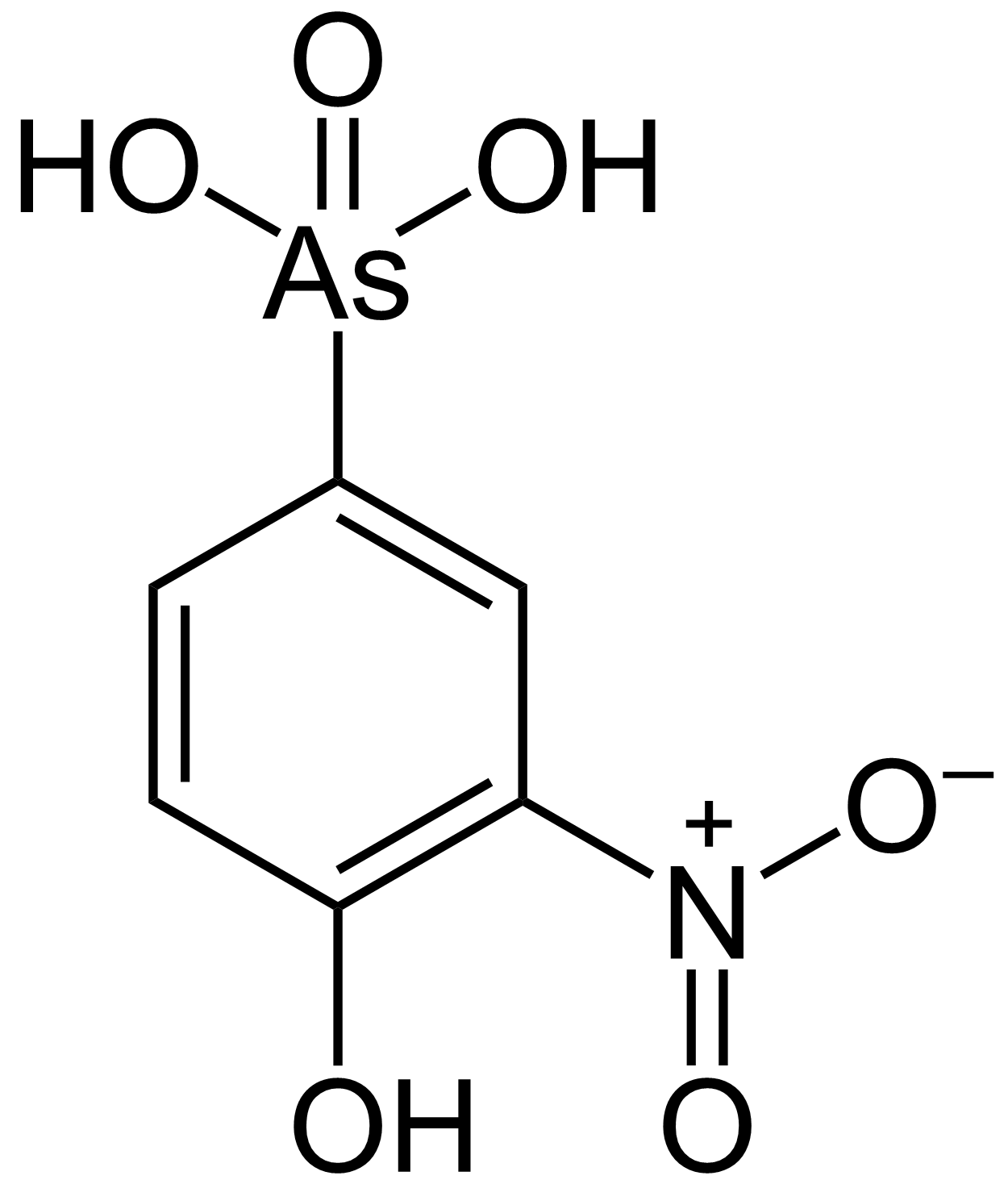
Roxarsone, a controversial arsenic compound used as a nutritional supplement for chickens

=== Growth hormones ===
Hormone use in poultry production is illegal in the United States. Similarly, no chicken meat for sale in Australia is fed hormones. Several scientific studies have documented the fact that chickens grow rapidly because they are bred to do so, not because of growth hormones.

=== E. coli ===
According to Consumer Reports, "1.1 million or more Americans [are] sickened each year by undercooked, tainted chicken." A USDA study discovered E. coli (Biotype I) in 99% of supermarket chicken, the result of chicken butchering not being a sterile process. However, the same study also shows that the strain of E. coli found was always a non-lethal form, and no chicken had any of the pathenogenic O157:H7 serotype. Many of these chickens, furthermore, had relatively low levels of contamination.

Feces tend to leak from the carcass until the evisceration stage, and the evisceration stage itself gives an opportunity for the interior of the carcass to receive intestinal bacteria. (The skin of the carcass does as well, but the skin presents a better barrier to bacteria and reaches higher temperatures during cooking.) Before 1950, this was contained largely by not eviscerating the carcass at the time of butchering, deferring this until the time of retail sale or in the home. This gave the intestinal bacteria less opportunity to colonize the edible meat. The development of the "ready-to-cook broiler" in the 1950s added convenience while introducing risk, under the assumption that end-to-end refrigeration and thorough cooking would provide adequate protection. E. coli can be killed by proper cooking times, but there is still some risk associated with it, and its near-ubiquity in commercially farmed chicken is troubling to some. Irradiation has been proposed as a means of sterilizing chicken meat after butchering.

The aerobic bacteria found in poultry housing can include not only E. coli, but Staphylococcus, Pseudomona, Micrococcus and others as well. These contaminants can contribute to dust that often causes issues with the respiratory systems of both the poultry and humans working in the environment. If bacterial levels in the poultry drinking water reach high levels, it can result in bacterial diarrhoea which can lead to blood poisoning should the bacteria spread from damaged intestines.

Salmonella too can be stressful on poultry production. How it causes disease has been investigated in some detail.

=== Avian influenza ===
There is also a risk that crowded conditions in chicken farms will allow avian influenza (bird flu) to spread quickly. A United Nations press release states: "Governments, local authorities and international agencies need to take a greatly increased role in combating the role of factory-farming, commerce in live poultry, and wildlife markets which provide ideal conditions for the virus to spread and mutate into a more dangerous form". An infected farm will likely have to prevent further spread by mass killing the chickens, often via less than humane methods of heatstroke. In the US, 85 million poultry birds were killed in 2022.

=== Dermatitis ===
Several dermatitis conditions are significant in chickens especially gangrenous dermatitis. GD is caused by Clostridium septicum, Clostridium perfringens type A, Clostridium sordellii, Clostridium novyi, Staphylococcus aureus, Staphylococcus xylosus, Staphylococcus epidermidis, Escherichia coli, Pasteurella multocida, Pseudomonas aeruginosa, Enterococcus faecalis, Proteus spp., Bacillus spp., Erysipelothrix rhusiopathiae, and Gallibacterium anatis var. haemolytica. Beemer et al. 1970 finds Rhodotorula mucilaginosa to cause a dermatitis in chickens easily confused with GD.

=== Efficiency ===
Farming of chickens on an industrial scale relies largely on high protein feeds derived from soybeans; in the European Union the soybean dominates the protein supply for animal feed, and the poultry industry is the largest consumer of such feed. Two kilograms of grain must be fed to poultry to produce 1 kg of weight gain, much less than that required for pork or beef. However, for every gram of protein consumed, chickens yield only 0.33 g of edible protein.

=== Economic factors ===
Changes in agricultural prices for poultry feed have a direct effect on the cost of doing business in the poultry industry. For instance, a significant rise in the price of corn in the United States can put significant economic pressure on large industrial chicken farming operations.

=== Waste management, manure ===
Poultry production requires regular control of excrement, and in many parts of the world, production operations, especially larger operations, need to comply with environmental regulations and protections. Unlike mammalian excrement, poultry (and all birds) excrete urine and feces as a combined manure, resulting in waste that is both wetter and higher in concentrated nitrogen.

Waste can be managed wet, dry or by some combination. Wet management is particularly used in battery egg laying operations, where the waste is sluiced out with constantly or occasionally flowing water. Water is also used to clean the floors around nesting sites that are separate from open runs. Dry management particularly refers to dry litter such as sawdust that is removed as needed. Dry can also include open pasture where manure is absorbed by the existing soil and vegetation, but needs to be monitored diligently so as to not overwhelm the ground capacity and lead to runoff and other pollution problems.

Both liquid sluicings and dry litter are used as organic fertilizers, but the wet bulk of liquid manure is harder to ship and is often limited to more local use, while the latter is easier to distribute in bulk and in commercial packaging.

=== Mortality ===
Mortality is a daily consideration for poultry farmers, and the carcasses must be disposed of in order to limit the spread of disease and the prevalence of pests. There are a variety of methods of disposal, the most common being burial, composting, incineration, and rendering. Environmental concerns surrounding each of these methods deal with nutrient pollution into the surrounding soil and groundwater – because of these concerns, in many countries and US states the practice of burial in pits is heavily regulated or disallowed. Farmers may construct their own facilities for composting, or purchase equipment to begin incineration or storage for rendering.

Composting offers a safe and practical use for the organic material, while proper management of a composting site limits odor and presence of pests. Incineration offers a swifter disposal method, but uses fuel energy and thus brings varying costs. Rendering has the advantage of being handled off site, and the use of freezers can eliminate the spread of pathogens in storage awaiting pickup. Government organizations, like the USDA, may offer financial assistance to farmers looking to begin utilizing environmentally friendly mortality solutions.

=== Predation ===
In North American production the most common predators are:

- the coyote
- foxes, especially the red fox
- the bobcat
- mustelids
  - weasels, especially the least weasel and long-tailed weasel
- birds of prey
  - hawks, especially the red-tailed, red-shouldered, and Cooper's hawk
  - owls, especially the great horned owl
- the raccoon
- the Virginia opossum
- skunks
- rodents
- snakes, especially the rat snake
- pet dogs and cats

== Worker health and safety ==
Poultry workers experience substantially higher rates of illness and injury than manufacturing workers do on average.

For 2013, there were an estimated 1.59 cases of occupation-related illness per 100 full-time U.S. meat and poultry workers, compared to 0.36 cases per 100 manufacturing workers overall. Injuries are associated with repetitive movements, awkward postures, and cold temperatures. High rates of carpal tunnel syndrome and other muscular and skeletal disorders are reported. Disinfectant chemicals and infectious bacteria are causes of respiratory illnesses, allergic reactions, diarrhea, and skin infections.

Poultry housing has been shown to have adverse effects on the respiratory health of workers, ranging from a cough to chronic bronchitis. Workers are exposed to concentrated airborne particulate matter (PM) and endotoxins (a harmful waste product of bacteria). In a conventional hen house a conveyor belt beneath the cages removes the manure. In a cage-free aviary system the manure coats the ground, resulting in the build-up of dust and bacteria over time. Eggs are often laid on the ground or under cages in the aviary housing, causing workers to come close to the floor and force dust and bacteria into the air, which they then inhale during egg collection.

Oxfam America reports that huge industrialized poultry operations are under such pressure to maximize profits that workers are denied access to toilets.

== World chicken population ==
The Food and Agriculture Organization of the United Nations estimated that in 2002 there were nearly sixteen billion chickens in the world. In 2008, China had the largest number of chickens in the world, with approximately 4.6 billion, followed by the US with more than 2 billion, and then Indonesia, Brazil, and Mexico. In 2019, China had over 5.14 billion chickens, a higher amount than any other country in the world, followed by Indonesia with approx 3.7 billion chickens. The countries with the next-highest amounts were the US, Brazil, Pakistan, Iran, India, Mexico, Russia and Myanmar respectively.

In 1950, the average American consumed 20 pounds (9 kg) of chicken per year, but 92.2 pounds (41.9 kg) in 2017. Additionally, in 1980 most chickens were sold whole, but by 2000 almost 90 percent of chickens were sold after being butchered into parts.

== By country ==
=== United States ===
Notable companies in the chicken production market of the USA include Tyson Foods, Sanderson Farms, Pilgrim's Pride, and Perdue Farms.

Most farmers produce their chicken contracted out by one of the large chicken production companies.

== See also ==
- Chicken harvester
- Environmental issues with agriculture
- Henopause
- Hy-Line International
- Poultry farming in the United States
- List of largest poultry slaughtering companies in Europe
