= Eichmühle =

Watermill in Regenstauf, Upper Palatinate, Germany

Coordinates: 49.1287°N 12.1305°E

The Eichmühle is an old corn mill on the banks of the river Regen in the village of Regenstauf not far from the city of Regensburg in Bavaria, Germany. The foundation walls of the building, whose water wheel is today used to produce electricity, dates to the late 15th century. In 1686, the mill owner, Anna Bayer, was declared a witch and prosecuted in a witch trial.

Today there is a French restaurant and beer garden in the old Eichmühle at Regenstauf. At least every two years the Eichmühle is surrounded by floodwaters from the river Regen and becomes an attraction for onlookers.
