= Regenstauf =

- Municipality
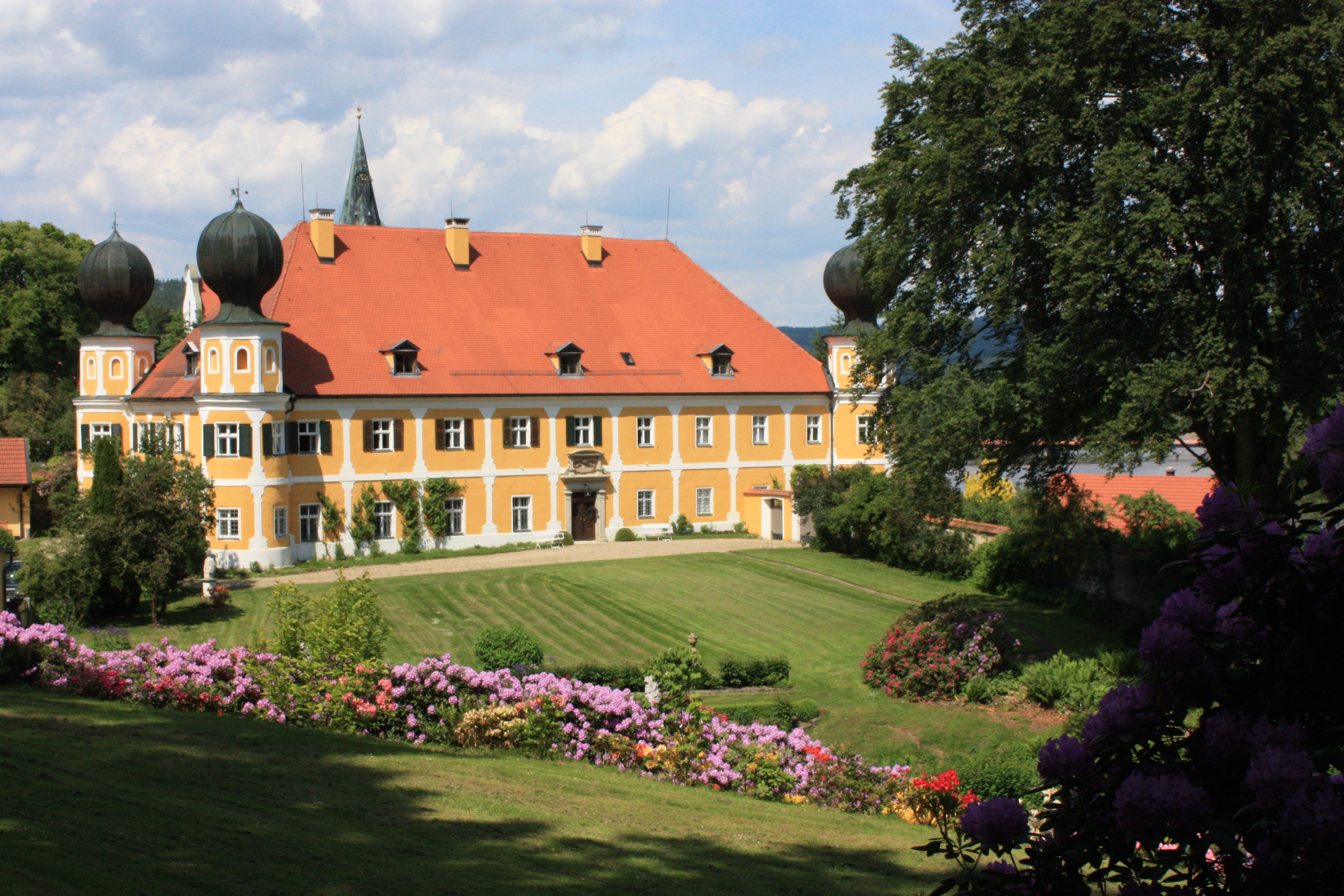
- Ramspau Palace

- Coat of arms

- Location of Regenstauf within Regensburg district
- Interactive map of Regenstauf
- Location within Germany Location within Bavaria
- Coordinates: 49°07′25″N 12°07′42″E
- Country: Germany
- State: Bavaria
- Admin. region: Oberpfalz
- District: Regensburg
- Subdivisions: 9 Ortsteile

Government
  - Mayor (2020–26): Josef Schindler (CSU)

Area
  - Total: 100.00 km^{2} (38.61 sq mi)
- Elevation: 334–580 m (1,096–1,903 ft)

Population (2025-12-31)
  - Total: 16,390
  - Density: 163.9/km^{2} (424.5/sq mi)
- Time zone: UTC+01:00 (CET)
  - Summer (DST): UTC+02:00 (CEST)
- Postal codes: 93128
- Dialling codes: 09402
- Vehicle registration: R
- Website: www.regenstauf.de

Regenstauf is a municipality in the district of Regensburg, in Bavaria, Germany. It is situated on the river Regen, 12 km north of Regensburg.

== Points of interest ==
- Eichmühle

== Economy ==
The WIMEX Group, an internationally active German concern in the meat and agricultural industry, was founded in and has its headquarters in Regenstauf.
