= Henopause =

When hens stop laying eggs

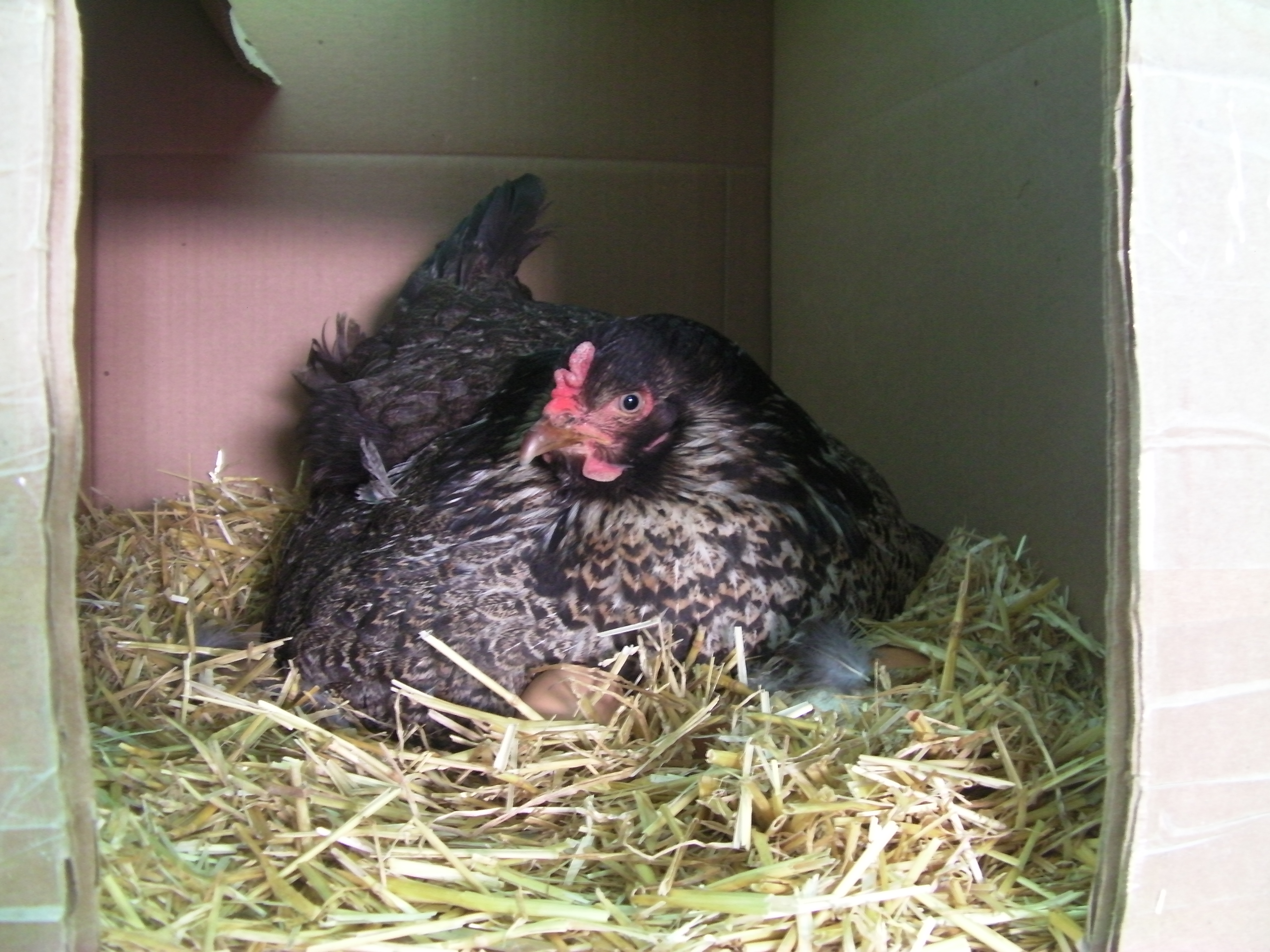
Brooding hen

Henopause, a portmanteau of "hen" and "menopause", is sometimes used to refer to the point at which hens stop laying eggs.

== Description ==
Although daily egg production starts to tail off after one year old, it may continue until 5–7 years old. Older hens gradually produce fewer eggs, and the eggs are usually larger. Since the average lifespan of a pet layer hen is 8–15 years, henopause has received attention as a potential problem for backyard or urban chicken farmers who are eventually faced with the decision to either slaughter older layers or keep them as non-producing pets. In the UK, the British Hen Welfare Trust charity rescues commercial hens who would otherwise be sent to slaughter when they become no longer commercially viable.

As many breeds of hen have been selectively bred for maximum egg production (300+ per year versus an ancestral 12 per year), many hens continue to lay for long periods, but may start to experience health complications such as egg yolk peritonitis (where the egg does not exit the body and thus causes fatal infections). Increasingly, those caring for chickens as pets may not have the expectation of eggs; some may even feed their hens' eggs back to them or even hormonally implant their hens to prevent egg-laying, which is purported to offer welfare benefits for the hens.

== Complications in keeping an affected hen ==
In commercial farming, a layer hen is considered no longer commercially viable at around thirteen months and is called a "spent hen".

== See also ==
- Forced molting
