= LDC Group =

European poultry meat producer

LDC (Lambert Dodard Chancereul)
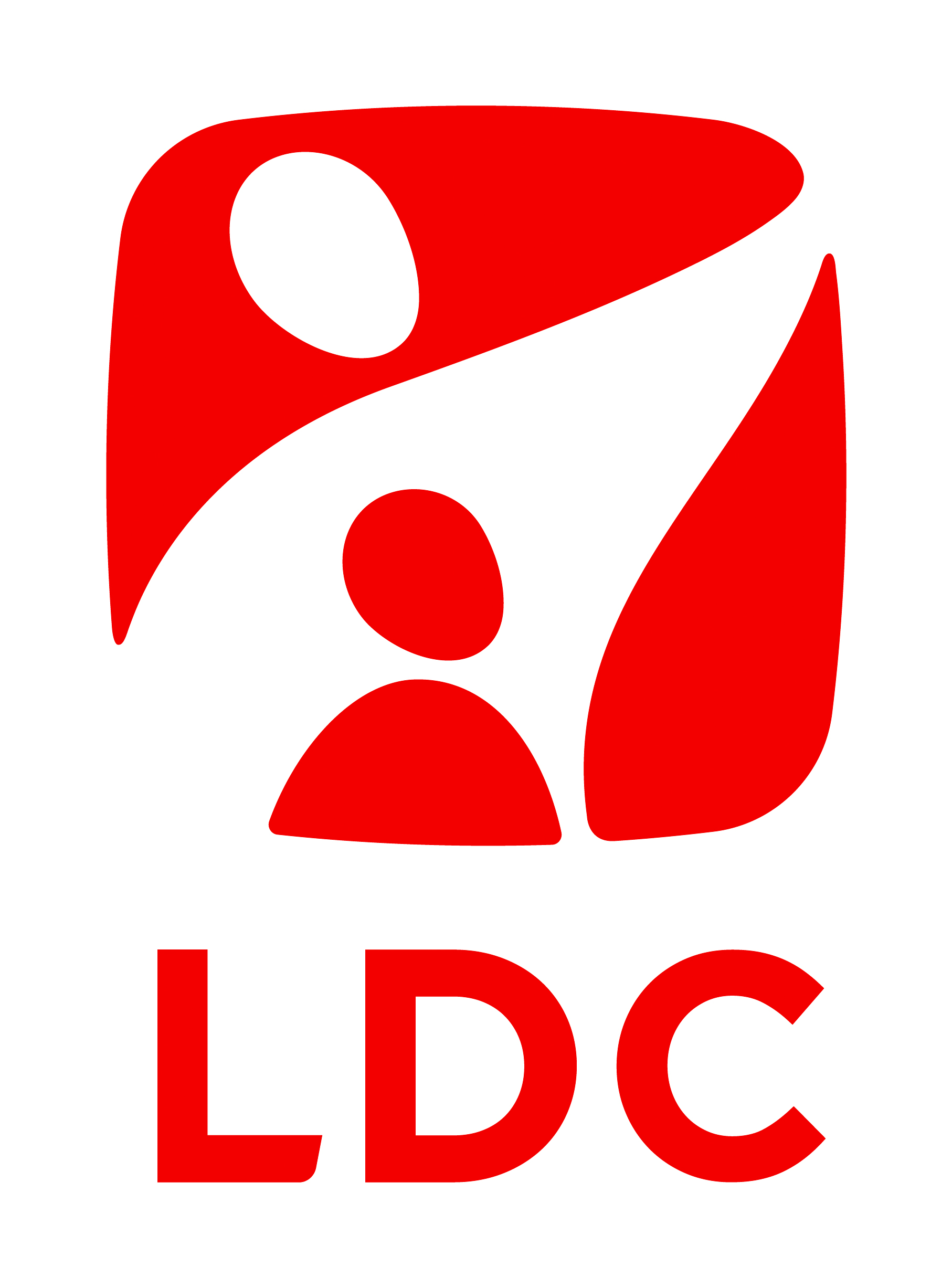
- Traded as: CAC All-Share
- ISIN: FR0013204336
- Industry: Meat industry
- Founded: 1968; 58 years ago
- Founder: Rémy Lambert, Auguste Dodard and Gérard Chancereul
- Headquarters: Sablé-sur-Sarthe, France
- Key people: Philippe Gélin
- Products: Poultry meat
- Revenue: €5.1 billion (2022)
- Operating income: 299,894,000 (2022)
- Net income: 225,979,000 (2022)
- Number of employees: 23.500 (2022)
- Website: https://www.ldc.fr/

LDC (Lambert Dodard Chancereul) is the largest poultry meat group in Europe. LDC carries out 578 million animal slaughters per year. The total revenue amounted to €5.1 billion in 2021/22.

The company is headquartered in Sablé-sur-Sarthe in France and operates 93 production sites in five European countries.

== History ==
The company was founded in 1968 as a merger of the family business Lambert based in Sablé-sur-Sarthe and Dodard-Chancereul based in Saint-Denis-d’Anjou. In 1970, the company expanded and opened a poultry slaughterhouse in Sablé-sur-Sarthe.

In the 1990s, LDC took over the convenience food company La Toque Angevine. In 1995, LDC went public at the Euronext Paris and conducted the first international takeover with Hermanos Saiz from Spain. Subsequently, the French company started an international expansion. Among others, the company took over the Polish company Drosed in 2000, the Hungarian Tranzit group in 2018, and the British poultry company Capestone Organic Poultry in 2021.

LDC also expanded in the French poultry farming and took over multiple competitors. In 2018, LDC took over parts of the insolvent Groupe Doux, and in 2022 the company Matines, one of the leading French egg producers, from the Avril group.

In 2022, LDC was struck by the historic outbreak of influenza A virus subtype H5N1 in France that lead to the culling of more than 12 million birds. The company had to shut down four slaughterhouses.

The executive management was passed from Denis Lambert to Philippe Gélin in 2022.

== Structure ==
With more than 578 million animal slaughters per year, LDC is the largest poultry meat company in France and Europe. Further business areas are the production of pork, beef, rabbit meat and eggs.

The company is structure in the three divisions: Poultry, International and Catered-Food.

60% of the revenue is generated in France, where LDC has a share of 40% on the poultry market and 50% in the market for chilled delicatessen. The international revenue was generated to large parts in Poland (67%), followed by Hungary (22%), Belgium (6%) and the United Kingdom (4,5%). The company also serves the German market via the sites in Poland.

=== Sales ===
LDC markets its products under a number of brands, among others Le Gaulois, Maître Coq and Marie. LDC also supplies chicken to McDonald's.

=== Shareholders ===
Around 70% of the shares are owned by the families Lambert (39.2%), Chancereul (17.3%), Huttepain (8.86%) and Guillet (3.89%). Around 13% are in public float, the other shares belong to white-collar workers, to the Sofiprotéol group and to the cooperative Agricole Fermiers de Loué.

== Controversies ==
LDC has been criticized by animal welfare organizations, notably regarding the density of animals and the usage of the fast-growing Ross 308 breed. French nonprofit L214 campaigned for LDC to adopt the European Chicken Commitment, which establishes a set of animal welfare standards for factory farms. In July 2025, LDC pledged to follow the European Chicken Commitment by 2028 for its brands Maître CoQ and Le Gaulois.

After an analysis of chicken meat samples in 2020, Germanwatch criticized that 57% of the samples from LDC were contaminated and 45% of the samples were found featuring antimicrobial resistance against drugs of last resort.
