= Fertilizer subsidies in Sub-Saharan Africa =

Opinions about the role of fertilizer subsidies in spurring agricultural development in Sub-Saharan Africa have fluctuated significantly over the past five decades. Many experts believe that fertilizer subsidies represent an essential method for achieving long term food security in Sub-Saharan Africa, while providing social support to Africa's poorest subsistence farmers. Yet previous universal subsidy schemes enjoyed only moderate success, raising concerns about whether the market distortions subsidies introduce can ever lead to a sustainable agricultural system. New practices in creating more targeted subsidies may be the key to achieving durable success.

== Rationale ==
Despite the potential benefits to crop yields, inorganic fertilizer application in Sub-Saharan Africa lags behind other developing regions. Average application in Sub-Saharan Africa is less than 10 kg per hectare, while the average application in Latin America and South Asia is nearly 140 kg per hectare. Sub-optimal or inefficient fertilizer use may result from farmers’ incomplete knowledge of its benefits or proper application techniques, inadequate (liquid) funds, or aversion to the risk associated with investing in a new input. Proponents of subsidies argue that they can help to mitigate these circumstances and bring fertilizer use up to optimal levels.

The implementation of subsidy programs may also be argued for equity reasons. Like other forms of social support (health, education spending) subsidies represent a redistribution of funds within a society, and can be an effective way to target subsistence farmers (a disproportionately large amount of Sub-Saharan Africa's poor).

Finally, subsidies may also create positive externalities, such as decreased soil erosion from increased plant growth. These external benefits may cause fertilizer to be undervalued in the market transaction, and thus represent another argument for government intervention through subsidies.

== 1970-1985: government intervention ==
During the 1960s and 70s many countries in Africa provided subsidized fertilizer to their farmers though state owned enterprises, or "parastatals," which generally enjoyed a monopoly on fertilizer distribution and import within the country. The fertilizer distributed by these enterprises sold at a universally reduced price, between 20 and 60 percent of the full market cost. Currency over-valuation also created an additional "implicit" subsidy for imported fertilizer. These policies were seen as a way to counteract the effects of soil erosion and depletion, and increase crop yields by bringing fertilizer within the reach of subsistence farmers. This followed the dominant ‘modernization’ model of the period, which aimed to develop production systems in the sector through the promotion of new technologies like fertilizer and improved hybrid seeds.

The subsidy programs often suffered from multiple problems. Inefficient bureaucracies contributed to delays in fertilizer delivery. Overstaffing and lack of efficiency incentives increased overall program costs. In cases of inadequate budgets, fertilizer was rationed, barring farmers from accessing sufficient amounts to apply to their crops. Finally, below market-level pricing disincentivized and displaced private distributors of fertilizer who no longer found it economically feasible to compete with subsidized fertilizer. This seriously jeopardized the financial sustainability of the programs.

== 1985-2005: economic liberalization ==
The 1980s saw the rise of neoclassical liberalism, the Washington Consensus and Structural Adjustment Programs. The dominant philosophy of this period saw underdevelopment as a symptom of allocative inefficiency, placed emphasis on the power of free markets to effect lasting development change and encouraged the minimization of the state's role in the economy.

=== Practices encouraged by structural adjustment programs ===
During this period, multilateral lending agencies and financial institutions such as the International Monetary Fund and the World Bank placed "conditionalities" upon the disbursement of development aid. Countries were required to agree to make a series of "structural adjustments" to their economies, in order to gain financial assistance or engage in refinancing. The common package of policies prescriptions included currency devaluation, privatization or divestiture of state-owned industries ("parastatals")in the health and agricultural sectors, trade liberalization (lowering or elimination of tariffs on imports), cuts in social spending (agriculture, health, education sectors) and strict deficit reductions. Structural Adjustment Programs also led to the phasing out of most fertilizer subsidy programs. Some of the African countries following these guidelines included Benin, Ghana, Madagascar, Senegal, Togo, Tanzania, Zambia, Cameroon, Malawi, and Nigeria.

=== Effects of liberalization ===
Results of liberalization and subsidy phase-out were mixed. In a five-year study comparing before and after cases, fertilizer use in Cameroon, Senegal, Tanzania, Nigeria and Ghana declined 25-40 percent, while it increased 14-500 percent in Benin, Togo, Mali, and Madagascar. Subsidies may have been only one factor affecting the price and use of fertilizer.

== 2005-present: new thinking in subsidies ==
Recently fertilizer subsidies have enjoyed renewed attention as a potentially potent tool for wide scale development in Africa. Jeffrey Sachs, founder of the Millennium Promise Alliance has said of fertilizer use in Africa, that governments should "provide subsidized fertilizers to subsistence farmers so that they can produce enough to eat." Recent successful programs in Malawi have also brought renewed attention to fertilizer subsidies.

=== Input vouchers ===
Input vouchers, or certificates allowing farmers to buy agricultural inputs (like fertilizer) at a reduced price, can more precisely target support than pre-structural adjustment universal subsidies. They may also complement the development of private markets, rather than de-incentivizing or undercutting them. The voucher programs are implemented as follows: a farmer receives a voucher that reduces the cost of fertilizer purchased from a private firm or distributor. The private firm can then redeem the voucher for cash plus a commission fee at a designated government facility. Thus the voucher represents a transfer of funds from the government to the farmer.

In contrast to blanket subsidies, input vouchers are compatible with private-sector distribution, and must utilize market structures to function. They foster private sector development by guaranteeing a client base and profit margin for the firm, which allows it to expand and develop an economy of scale. Proponents see them as a way to encourage greater adoption of fertilizer use without the blatant market distortions of earlier schemes. Importantly, an "exit strategy" is more feasible with the voucher program than with universal subsidies. As the private distribution network develops, the voucher can gradually be reduced in value, and be phased out entirely once private markets are functioning.

=== Complementary practices ===
Input voucher programs rely heavily on complementary policies and practices in order to function effectively. For instance, some existing distribution networks (shops, or retailers) must be in place already in order to ensure wide penetration of the input. Some access to microcredit may be necessary to help defray even the initial subsidized costs. Furthermore, subsidized fertilizer programs are most effective when they encourage non-users (farmers who otherwise would not use fertilizer) to participate, thereby creating new sources of production.

=== Concerns ===
Careful program design is needed to precisely target needy farmers, guard against "leakage" (in which wealthier farmers take advantage of the subsidy program) and maintain a degree of excludability. Wealthier farmers may be in a better position to take advantage of the subsidies, thereby thwarting the original aim of the program. Additionally, the budget allotments for fertilizer subsidies may also incur opportunity costs by diverting public resources away from agricultural extension services, infrastructure building, or research and development.

== See also ==
- Agricultural subsidy
- Subsistence agriculture#Intensive subsistence farming
- Washington Consensus
- IFPRI
- Fertilizer#Inorganic fertilizer (synthetic fertilizer)
