= Doux Group =

French food processing company

Groupe Doux S.A.
- Type: Société Anonyme
- Industry: Food processing
- Founded: 1955
- Headquarters: Châteaulin
- Key people: Pierre Jean Doux, Charles Doux, Guy Odri
- Products: Frozen food
- Revenue: 475 million euros (2013)
- Website: www.doux.com

Doux Group, founded in 1955 and headquartered in Châteaulin, Finistère (France), is a French food processing company in the industrial poultry production business, exporting poultry-based processed products. In 2014, it was ranked as the largest producer of poultry in Europe, and the third largest in the world. The group is led by Arnaud Marion, who has been the CEO of Doux since late 2012.

== History ==
=== Beginnings and industrialization: 1930 - 1970 ===
In 1933, Pierre Doux started his poultry business in Nantes (France) in 1933. In 1955, he moved to Port Laudnay and opened Doux's first slaughterhouse. The poultry farming in Breton developed into soilless cultivation which meant the feeding of poultry with food from outside the farming area.

In the 1960s, Doux adopted a hybrid chicken system where different chicken strains could inter breed and gain the benefits of their respective physiological attributes. By now, Doux was working closely with the Institute of Animal Breeding (Institut de sélection animale (ISA)) to retain the best chicken strains according to their physiological attributes. Then later in the 1960s, Doux worked closely with the Institute of Animal Breeding (Institut de sélection animale (ISA)) to retain the best chicken strains according to their physiological attributes. Also during this time, the company bought its first freezing machines in the US and initiated the development of a trading frozen poultry to the Middle East.

In 1975, Charles Doux became head of the company founded by his father.

=== Internationalization: 1970-2003 ===
In the 1970s, Doux went international and became the first frozen and processed poultry exporter to Saudi Arabia, Qatar and the United Arab Emirates. In 1990, Doux agreed to purchase Père Dodu (full acquisition in 1998), a leading brand of poultry products in France. They set up the delivery location near the coast to avoid any religious problems, blockades or otherwise.

In 1991, Doux bought the brand Père Dodu of the group Guyomarch, which was finalized in 1998 with the purchase of Soprat.

The Gatt agreements signed in Marrakesh in 1994 required the EU to reduce its export aid, and Doux lost half its export market.

In 1998, Doux acquired Francosul, Brazil's leading poultry processing company for countries where production costs make them more competitive. Following was the development of Brazilian protectionism which indebted Doux 200 million euros. In May 2012, Doux agreed to lease its Brazilian assets to its competitor JBS SA through a 10-year renewable contract, but could not clear its €200 million debt associated to its Brazilian operations.

=== Financial difficulties: 2004-2011 ===
In 2004, avian flu brought down the global poultry market. That year, the Doux Group posted a loss of 14 million euros. Between October 2005 and February 2006, sales dropped 15 to 20%, and 25% to 30% between late February and early March 2006. Doux recorded a total loss of 45.3 million euros and the following year a loss of 35.3 million euros. In total, from 2002 to 2008, the turnover of Doux fell 6.7% to $1.5 billion euros. In 2008, Doux recorded a loss of 7 million euros.

In 2008, Doux was faced with the aftermath of the avian flu outbreak and soaring grain and oil prices, and given the impossibility to pass on these increases in selling prices in supermarkets, they were forced to overhaul their industrial organization to increase its competitiveness and thus perpetuate its presence in the fresh market in France. This reorganization results in the closing of the Locminé and Châtelet. sites for economic reasons and allows a return Doux to its 52 million recorded profits of 2009.

In 2009, the Doux Group was the first player in the industry to export directly to China from their production sites in Brazil, which exports 50% of Doux's poultry production to a hundred countries. As the group is the largest recipient in France, export aid from the European Union was decided in the context of the CAP in the amount of 200 to 300 euros per ton of exported poultry (which accounted for 63 million Public aid from October 2007 to October 2008).

In Brazil, in June 2009, to try to find the financial balance between a buoyant Brazilian market and costly terms of development for Doux, they sold its Brazilian subsidiary to the Brazilian turkey production company Marfrig 23.6 million euros. From 2011, the protectionist policy of Dilma Rousseff devoured the Doux's Brazil competitive edge. In May 2012, unable to sell its Brazilian assets, Doux sold its Brazilian industry in lease management in the Brazilian food company JBS Friboi, but failed to shed their debts.

In July 2013, Brussels decided to freeze aid to the export of frozen products, a blow to Doux, who once benefited from 55 million euros in aid in 2012.

=== Restructure and recovery: since 2012 ===
On May 24, 2012, Doux announced the appointment of Jean-Charles Doux to the position of Deputy CEO to negotiate the financial crisis.

In June 2012, Charles Doux decided to restructure Doux in judicial recovery due to the lingering debt of €320 million. Two months later, Doux announced their interest in focusing primarily on their exports, which constituted 81% of their turnover and reducing their fresh productions. During the same year, in October, they called Arnaud Marion in this complex situation, an expert in crisis management, and confided in him the details of the reorganization of the company to create and validate a plan for Doux's continuation.

Since his appointment as director in charge with the recovery Doux Group, Arnaud Marion negotiated with Barclays and Almunajem Group to gain the financial support of €30 million for the monetary needs until the end of the observation period and oppose the encroaching reprisal of the developed products and exports by the consortium Sofiprotéol (Glon Sanders, Tilly Sabco and Terrena).

In May 2013, Arnaud Marion sought the D&P holding firm led by Didier Calmels, a specialist in the recapitalization and business turnaround, which then took two-thirds of the Doux's capital. Alongside Arnaud Marion, D&P negotiated the purchase of the Barclays debt and its incorporation to the group's capital, which would greatly relieve the company from debt. Arnaud Marion was then appointed Chairman of the Corporate Executive Board. The continuation plan was then validated by the Quimper Commercial Court on November 29, 2013. As a part of this plan, Didier Calmels became the majority shareholder with 52.2% share, and in October 2014, Saudi group Al-Munajem acquired 25%.

This restructuring was met with a strong increase in business. In January 2015, the group was counting on an operating profit of 25 million euros. Also, in 2015, an announcement was made that Doux hired a hundred new employees, thanks to an increase in sales in the Middle East. Both announcements were marked by the visits to the industrial site by the Minister of Economy, Emmanuel Macron.

=== Acquisition: 2018 ===
In May 2018, Groupe Doux's main shareholder, French agricultural cooperative Terrena, sought for buyers "after Doux lost around 35 million euros in each of the past two years." The insolvent firm was acquired by LDC LOUP.PA, France's largest poultry processor, and Saudi food group Al-Munajem, saving most of the nearly 1,200 jobs at Groupe Doux.

== Activity ==
=== Market ===
Doux is present on all poultry markets: chicken and turkey; frozen, whole, breaded products (cordons bleus, nuggets, burgers), and quick serve meals. Each production type has a dedicated site: poultry slaughterhouses destined for frozen and processed products. The main brands of the group are Doux and Supreme à l’export, and Père Dodu in France. The major customers of Doux are:

- food retail and convenience stores;
- food service, commercial or collective;
- the food industry

=== Economic Model ===
Doux is an integrated player with its own breeding farms (28 farms and 170 buildings), its hatchery (130 million chicks annually), its farmers (325 farmers and 200 integrated farmers cooperatives), its food factories (450,000 tons of annual production), abattoirs (3 sites lid 180 million chickens each year, or 180,000 tons), its plants in processed products (annual production of 40,000 tons), Brittany and Pays the Loire. Doux has 9 production sites in France, including 3 slaughterhouses, for prepping and shipping, 2 sites for processed products, 2 hatcheries and 2 food plants. In 2014, Doux was the first French hatchery with a production of 170 million eggs. Their food factories produce 450,000 tons annually.

In 2014, Doux employed over 2,200 people and ranked 600th and the 15th French Breton employer.

In 2014, Doux, the third largest player behind the Brazilian JBS Friboi (with a $55 billion turnover) and BRF (with a $10 billion turnover) was the European leader with 90% of production poultry for export to Europe and France.

=== Halal Certification ===
The Doux Group ensures production certified halal meat. Doux uses the method of electronarcosis and mechanical slaughter, a certified method by AFCAI, an organization recognized by the Great Mosque of Paris. This production is on dedicated production lines and 100% of this production is destined for export.

Doux has exported to the Middle East for more than 50 years (Saudi Arabia, United Arab Emirates, Yemen, Oman, etc.), all destination where the slaughter method is exclusively halal.
