= Plukon Food Group =

International poultry meat company

Coordinates: 52°27′10.0″N 5°59′44.0″E

Plukon Food Group (Bankiva B.V.)
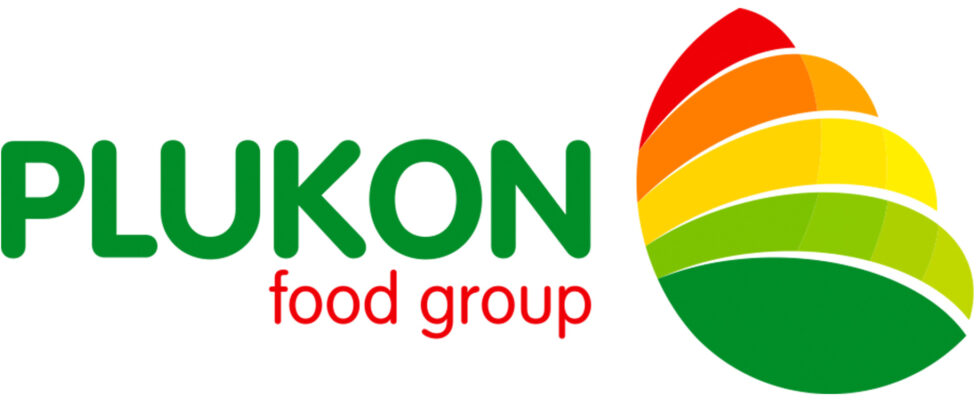
- Industry: Meat industry
- Founded: 1978; 48 years ago
- Headquarters: Wezep, Netherlands
- Key people: Kees Kraaijenoord
- Products: Chicken meat
- Revenue: €3.0 billion (2020)
- Number of employees: nearly 9,000
- Website: www.plukon.nl

Plukon Food Group is an internationally active corporate group in the meat industry. It is one of the largest processors of poultry meat in Europe.

In 2019, Plukon was the second largest chicken processor in the EU, as well as 16th in the world, with a slaughter volume of 426 million chickens.

The activities of the group are concentrated in the company Bankiva B.V. headquartered in Wezep in the Netherlands. The group has three shareholders: the German EW Group, the Dutch feed company De Heus, and the directors around Peter Poortinga, who together own 25% of the shares.

== History ==
In 1978, Plukon was created as a merger of the 1964 established brand Friki and the poultry company Bekebrede in Barneveld, the name being the acronym Pluimvee Kombinatie Nederland.

In 2011, German poultry company Stolle was merged into the Plukon group.

In 2015, the EW Group became shareholder of Plukon. In the following years, Plukon acquired the French poultry producer DUC, the Spanish poultry producer VMR and the German hatchery Optibrut.

== Structure ==
Plukon operates 30 branches in the Netherlands, Germany, Poland, Belgium, France and Spain. In total, Plukon employs nearly 9,000 people; its weekly slaughter capacity is about 9 million chickens. The company's sales in 2022 amounted to over 3.0 billion euros.

Plukon's main sales territories are the Netherlands, Germany, Belgium, France, the United Kingdom and Ireland. In Germany, products are marketed either fresh or frozen under the brands Friki, Pingo, Stolle, Maiski, FairMast and private labels.

For chicken fattening, Plukon utilizes day-old chicks of the hybrid chicken breed Cobb from the supplier WIMEX Group.

The five-member supervisory board includes Germans Jürgen Steinemann (chairman) and Erich Wesjohann.

=== Plukon in Germany ===
Plukon is (as of 2019) the fifth largest company in the poultry industry in Germany. Plukon Germany employs 1,400 people and operates five facilities.

== Controversies ==
Since 2014, there have been repeated protests against the Plukon slaughterhouse in Gudensberg, Germany. In February 2014, several hundred people demonstrated against a planned expansion of the facility, followed by another demonstration in 2015. In April 2021, the trade union Nahrung-Genuss-Gaststätten organized a demonstration in Gudensberg for better working conditions of the workers. In May 2021, environmental activists blocked the access roads of the poultry slaughterhouse in Gudensberg in an action of civil disobedience. The activists demanded a closure of the plant for reasons of animal welfare and danger of Corona infections.
