= Forced molting =

Practice of artificially provoking a flock to molt simultaneously

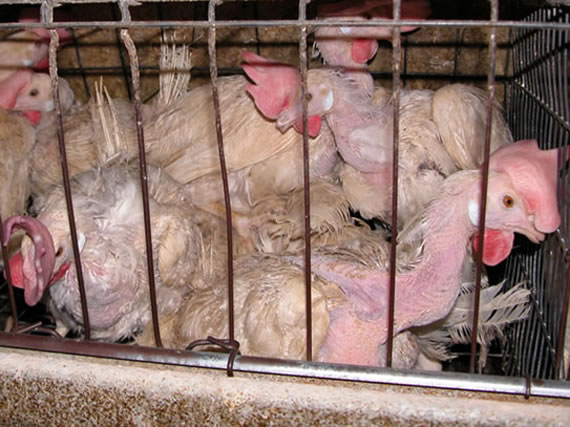
Forced molting typically involves the removal of food and/or water from poultry for an extended period of time to reinvigorate egg-laying.

Forced molting, sometimes known as induced molting, is the practice by some poultry industries of artificially provoking a flock to molt simultaneously, typically by withdrawing food for 7–14 days and sometimes also withdrawing water for an extended period. Forced molting is usually implemented when egg-production is naturally decreasing toward the end of the first egg-laying phase. During the forced molt, the birds cease producing eggs for at least two weeks, which allows the bird's reproductive tracts to regress and rejuvenate. After the molt, the hen's egg production rate usually peaks slightly lower than the previous peak, but egg quality is improved. The purpose of forced molting is therefore to increase egg production, egg quality, and profitability of flocks in their second or subsequent laying phases, by not allowing the hen's body the necessary time to rejuvenate during the natural cycle of feather replenishment.

The practice is controversial. While it is widespread in the US, it is prohibited in the EU.

== Background ==
Commercial hens usually begin laying eggs at 16–20 weeks of age, although production gradually declines soon after from approximately 25 weeks of age. This means that in many countries, by approximately 72 weeks of age, flocks are considered economically unviable and are slaughtered after approximately 12 months of egg production, although chickens will naturally live for 6 or more years. However, in some countries, rather than being slaughtered, the hens are force molted to re-invigorate egg-laying for a second, and sometimes subsequent, laying phase.

Forced molting simulates the natural process where chickens grow a new set of feathers in the autumn, a process generally accompanied by a sharp reduction or cessation of egg production. Natural molting is stimulated by shortening day lengths combined with stress (of any kind). Before confinement housing with artificial lights was the norm, the autumn molt caused a seasonal scarcity of eggs and high market prices. Farmers attempted to pamper their flocks to prevent the molt as long as possible, to take advantage of the high prices. Modern controlled-environment confinement housing has the opposite problem; the hens are not normally presented with sufficient stress or cues to go into molt naturally. However, after laying almost daily for nearly a year, their rate of egg production declines, as does the quality of the eggshell and the egg contents. In addition, the hens are overweight.

It is sometimes claimed that forced molting is an artifact of modern intensive animal farming, but the practice predates the vertical integration of the poultry industry by decades; former Head of the Poultry Science Department at the University of Maryland, Morley A. Jull prescribes a precise molting program in his 1938 book, Poultry Husbandry.

== Methods ==
For a complete recovery of the reproductive tract, the hen's body weight must drop by 30 to 35 percent during the forced molt. This is typically achieved by withdrawing the hen's feed for 7–14 days, sometimes up to 28 days. This induces the birds to lose their feathers, cease to lay eggs and lose body-weight. Some programs combine feed withdrawal with a period of water withdrawal. Most programs also restrict the amount of lighting to provide a daylight period that is too short to stimulate egg production, providing a simulated autumn, the natural time of molt and minimum egg production.

Forced molting programs sometimes follow other variations. Some do not eliminate feed altogether, but may induce a molt by providing a low-density diet (e.g. grape pomace, cotton seed meal, alfalfa meal) or dietary manipulation to create an imbalance of a particular nutrient(s). The most important among these include manipulation of minerals including sodium, calcium, iodine and zinc, with full or partially reduced dietary intakes. These alternative methods of forced molting have not been widely used by the egg industries.

In 2003, more than 75% of all flocks in the US were molted.

== Mortality ==
Some birds die during forced molting and it has been recommended that the flock must be managed so that mortality does not exceed 1.25% over the 1–2 weeks of (nearly complete) feed withdrawal, compared to a 0.5% to 1.0% monthly mortality in a well-managed flock under low-stress conditions. Alternative methods of forced molting which do not use total food withdrawal, e.g. creating a dietary mineral imbalance, generally result in lower mortality rates.

== Controversy ==
Temporary starvation of the hens is considered by many to be inhumane as well as a form of animal cruelty, and is the main objection of critics and opponents of the practice.

While forced molting is widespread in the US, it is prohibited in the EU. In the UK, the Department for Environment, Food and Rural Affairs (Defra) states In no circumstances may birds be induced to moult by withholding feed and water. Forced molting is not a common practice in Canada, where the animal welfare issues associated with it have rendered it basically obsolete.

Forced molting increases plasma corticosterone which, along with related hormones, decreases the levels of circulating lymphocytes and other leukocytes, thereby reducing the effectiveness of the bird's immune system. This means that birds being force molted become susceptible to disease, particularly Salmonella infections, and may produce contaminated eggs thereby compromising public health.
