= Cherkizovo =

Moscow-based Russian food company

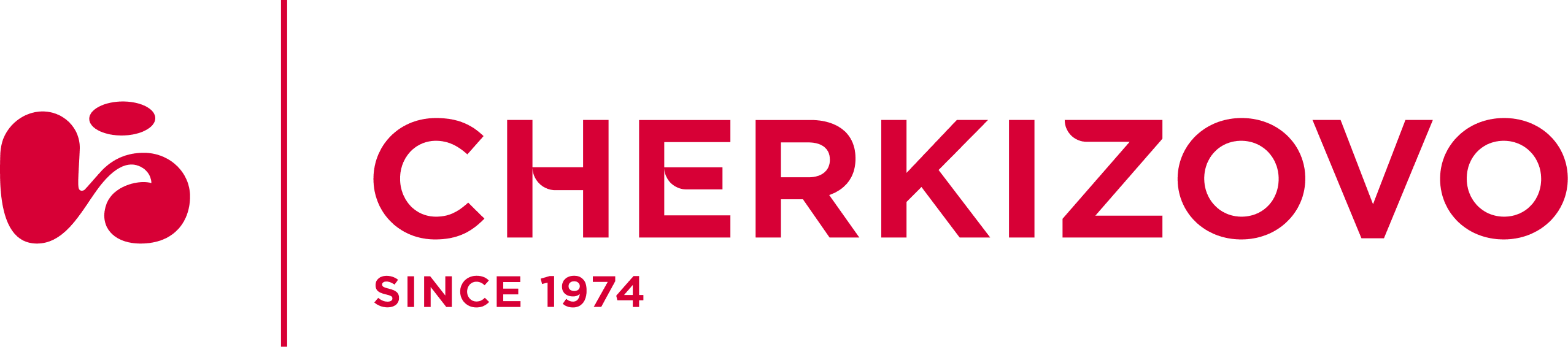
- Native name: Черкизово
- Company type: Open Joint-Stock Company
- Traded as: MCX: GCHE
- Industry: Food industry
- Founded: 2005
- Headquarters: Russia, Moscow
- Key people: Evgeny Mikhailov (Chairman of the Board); Sergey Mikhailov (CEO)
- Products: Meat products
- Revenue: $3.45 billion (2025)
- Operating income: $591 million (2025)
- Net income: $233 million (2025)
- Total assets: $4.31 billion (2025)
- Total equity: $1.8 billion (2025)
- Number of employees: above 20,000
- Website: Official website

Cherkizovo (full name: Open Joint Stock Company 'Cherkizovo') is a Moscow-based Russian food company that is a major producer and processor of poultry and pork.

== History ==
The group was founded in 2005 in the union of the APC "Cherkizovsky" and APC "Mikhaylovskiy".

In May 2011, Cherkizovo completed the acquisition of 100% of Mosselprom, a company specializing in the production of poultry products. It costed Cherkizovo $252.9 million, of which $183.8 million was Mosselprom's debt. Part of the deal was paid for with shares of Cherkizovo itself.

In March 2014, Cherkizovo Group acquired the largest Voronezh poultry meat producer LISKO Broiler. According to Kommersant newspaper, the deal was worth 5 billion rubles. Thus, Cherkizovo became the largest producer of poultry meat in Russia: as a result of the acquisition of LISKO Broiler (about 95 thousand tons of meat per year), the company's poultry capacity reached 550 thousand tons, ahead of the previous leader, Prioskolye (470 thousand tons per year).

In December 2018, Cherkizovo bought an asset in Siberia for 4.6 billion roubles ($70 million) from its local rival ZAO Prioskolie.

In December 2021, Cherkizovo announced 100% asset consolidation of "Tambovskaya Indeyka" LLC, by buying back 50% of capital of Spanish "Grupo Fuertes" in their joint LLC. In January 2022, the deal wal closed and thereby "Grupo Fuertes" increased its stake in the holding company, PJSC "Cherkizovo Group" from 8,58% up to 11,12%.

In February 2022, Cherkizovo announced 8,5 billion roubles of investments in a pig complex in Tambov Oblast, totalling company`s investments in the region by 15 billion roubles since 2013.

== Owners and management ==
In 2010, the main shareholders of the company was the JPMorgan Chase Bank (31.9%) and the company MB Capital Partners (58.74%); whose owners (in the par basis) chairman Igor Babaev, CEO Sergei Mikhailov, Lydia Mikhailov, and Evgeny Mikhailov.

In May 2006, Cherkizovo held an IPO at Russian Trading System, the Moscow Stock Exchange and the London Stock Exchange (LSE). As a result, 27.8% of the total share capital is in free circulation. The group's capitalization after IPO reached 904 million.

== Activities ==
In 2011, the group announced the investment of 19.5 billion rubles in a major project for the production and processing of poultry meat in the Lipetsk Oblast.

=== Performance ===
In 2012, the company sold 319.2 thousand tons of poultry meat, 103.8 thousand tons of pork, 127.4 thousand tons of processed meat products and has collected more than 115 tons of various cultures. Wheat yield was about 3.4 tons per hectare, barley yield was about 3.3 tonnes per hectare, sunflower yield was about 2.6 tonnes per hectare, and maize yield was about 6.1 tonnes per hectare, which exceeded the average. Revenue U.S. GAAP in 2012 amounted to $1,581.7 million, EBITDA of $314.6 million, and net profit of $225.2 million.
