= Indian Game =

Indian Game may refer to:

- Indian Defense, also known as the Indian Game, a chess opening occurring after 1.d4 Nf6
- Indian Game (poultry), a breed of game chicken also known as the Cornish chicken
