= Coquelet =

Coquelet may refer to:

- Coquelet, a type of multiple frequency-shift keying signal
- Coquelet, another name for a poussin (chicken)
