= Bush legs =

Chicken leg quarters from the U.S., in post-Soviet states

"Bush legs" (Russian: ножки Буша, romanized: nozhki Busha) is a prevailing term in the post-Soviet states that denotes chicken leg quarters from the United States.

The expression first appeared in 1990 when Mikhail Gorbachev and George H. W. Bush signed a trade agreement about delivery of frozen chicken leg quarters to the Soviet Union. In those times, the USSR was experiencing food shortages and "Bush legs" enjoyed wide popularity.

== Economics ==
As of 2006, the United States was the largest supplier of chicken to Russia, with only 55% of purchased chicken being domestically raised, 35% imported from the US, 6% from Brazil, and 4% from other countries, primarily in Europe. In 2005, the Russian and American governments signed an agreement where, until 2009, 74% of the chicken import quota would belong to American suppliers in return for the annual expansion of supplies by 40 thousand metric tons.

White meat is more popular in the US, particularly chicken breast, lowering the cost of exported dark meat like the legs and thighs.

In 2010, Russian Chief Sanitary Inspector Nikolay Vlasov banned all chlorinated chicken.

In 2014, all US meat was banned in Russia due to embargo. In 2015, Russia covered all imported chicken by domestic meat.
