= Poussin (chicken) =

Commonwealth butcher's term for a young chicken

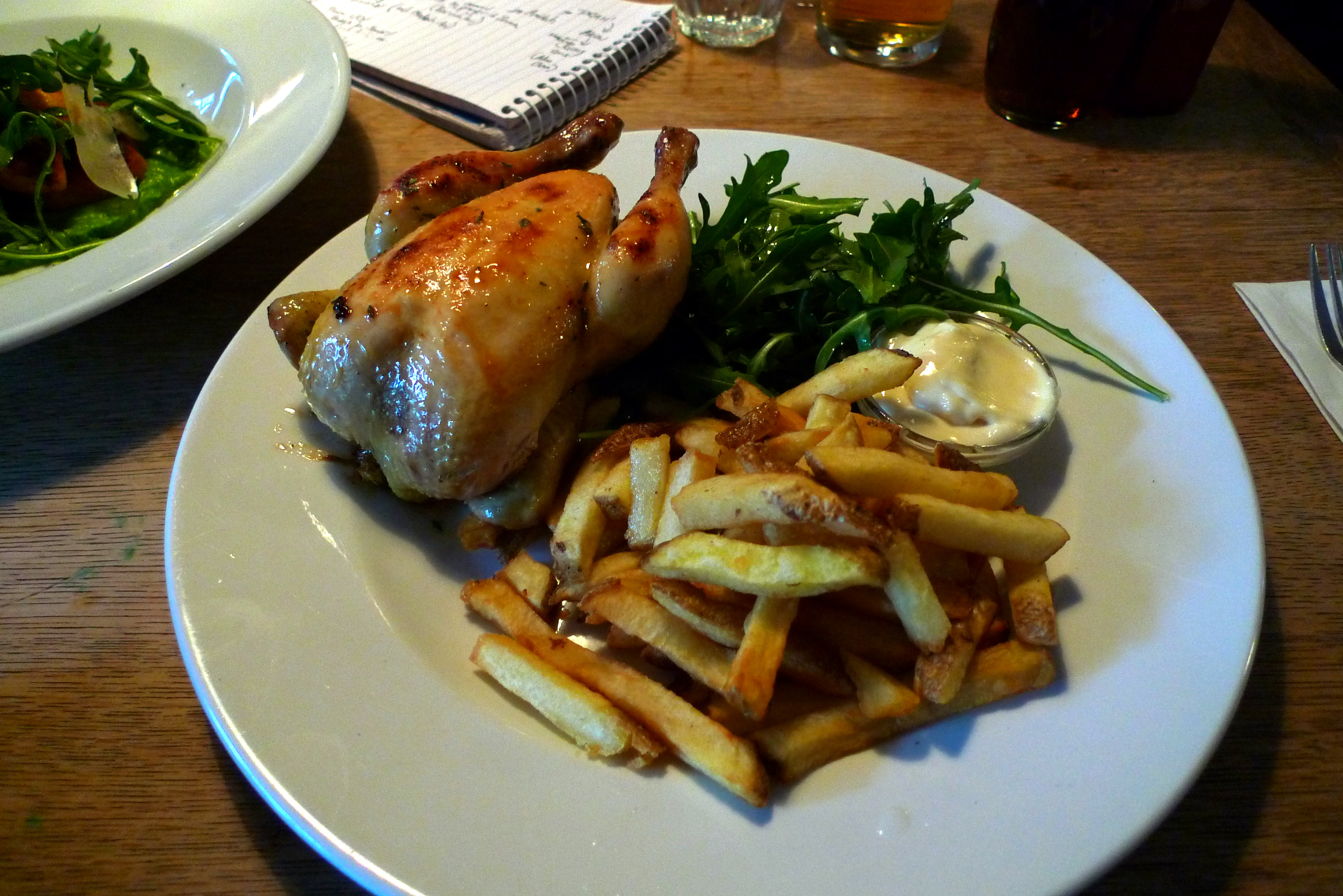
A meal of roast poussin and chips in London

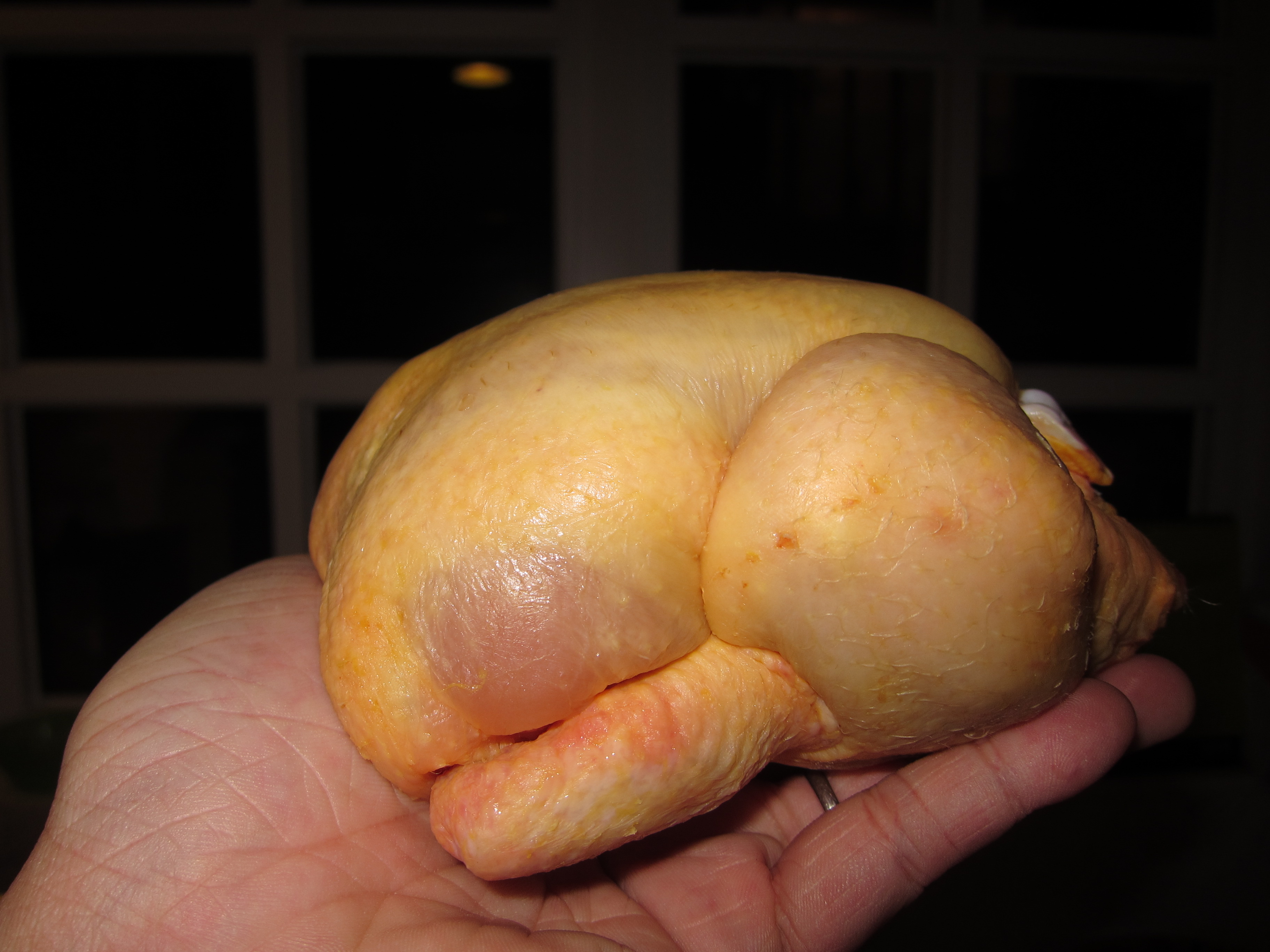
A poussin held in the hand

In Commonwealth countries, poussin (pronounced /ˈpuːsæn/ is less commonly called coquelet) is a butcher's term for a young chicken, less than 28 days old at slaughter and usually weighing 400–450 grams (14–16 oz) but not above 750 grams (26 oz). It is sometimes also called spring chicken, although the term spring chicken usually refers to chickens weighing 750–850 grams (26–30 oz). The word is the French language term for the same thing. Normally a portion is a whole poussin per person.

In the United States, poussin is an alternative name for a small-sized cross-breed chicken called Rock Cornish game hen, developed in the late 1950s, which is twice as old and twice as large as the typical British poussin.
