= Indian Game (poultry) =

British breed of chicken

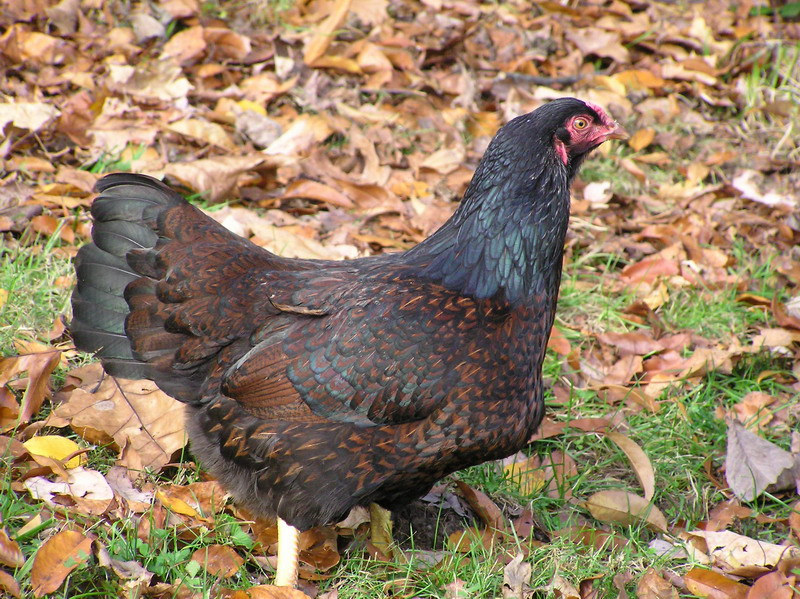
- Dark Indian Game
- Conservation status: FAO (2007): not at risk; RBST (2025): priority
- Country of origin: United Kingdom
- Distribution: world-wide
- Use: formerly cockfighting; meat; show

Traits
- Weight: Male: standard: 3.6 kg; bantam: 2.0 kg; Female: standard: 2.7 kg; bantam: 1.5 kg
- Egg colour: light brown

Classification
- APA: English
- EE: yes
- PCGB: heavy: hard feather
- Chicken; Gallus gallus domesticus

The Indian Game is a British breed of game chicken, now reared either for meat or exhibition. It originated in the early nineteenth century in the counties of Cornwall and Devon in south-west England. It is a heavy, muscular bird with an unusually broad breast; the eggs are light brown.

In the United States the name was changed in the early twentieth century to Cornish. A white variant, the White Cornish, was developed there at about the same time, and is much used in modern industrial chicken meat production in many parts of the world, either for cross-breeding to produce hybrid broilers, or to produce fast-growing "game hens".

== History ==
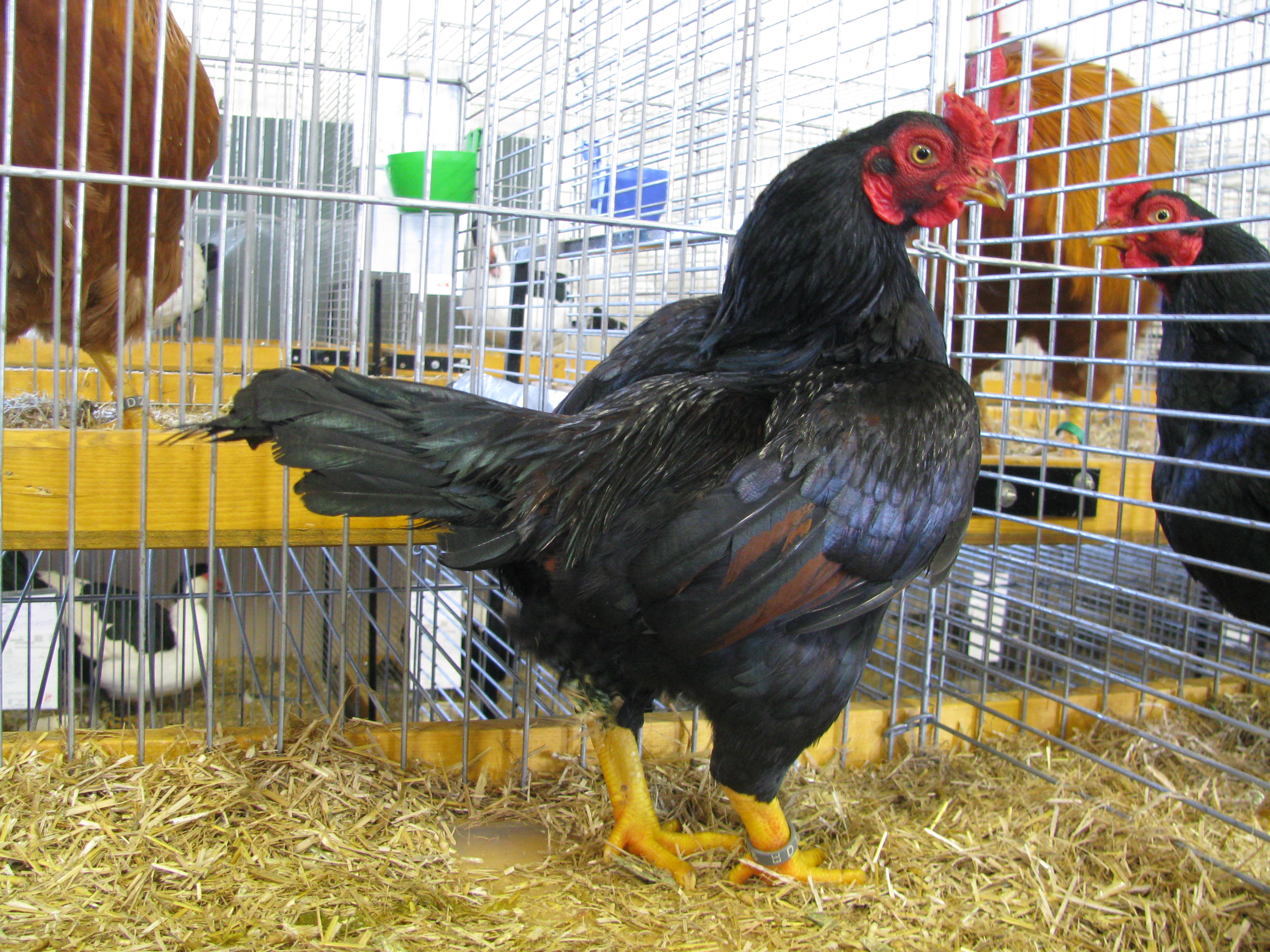
An Indian Game bantam male

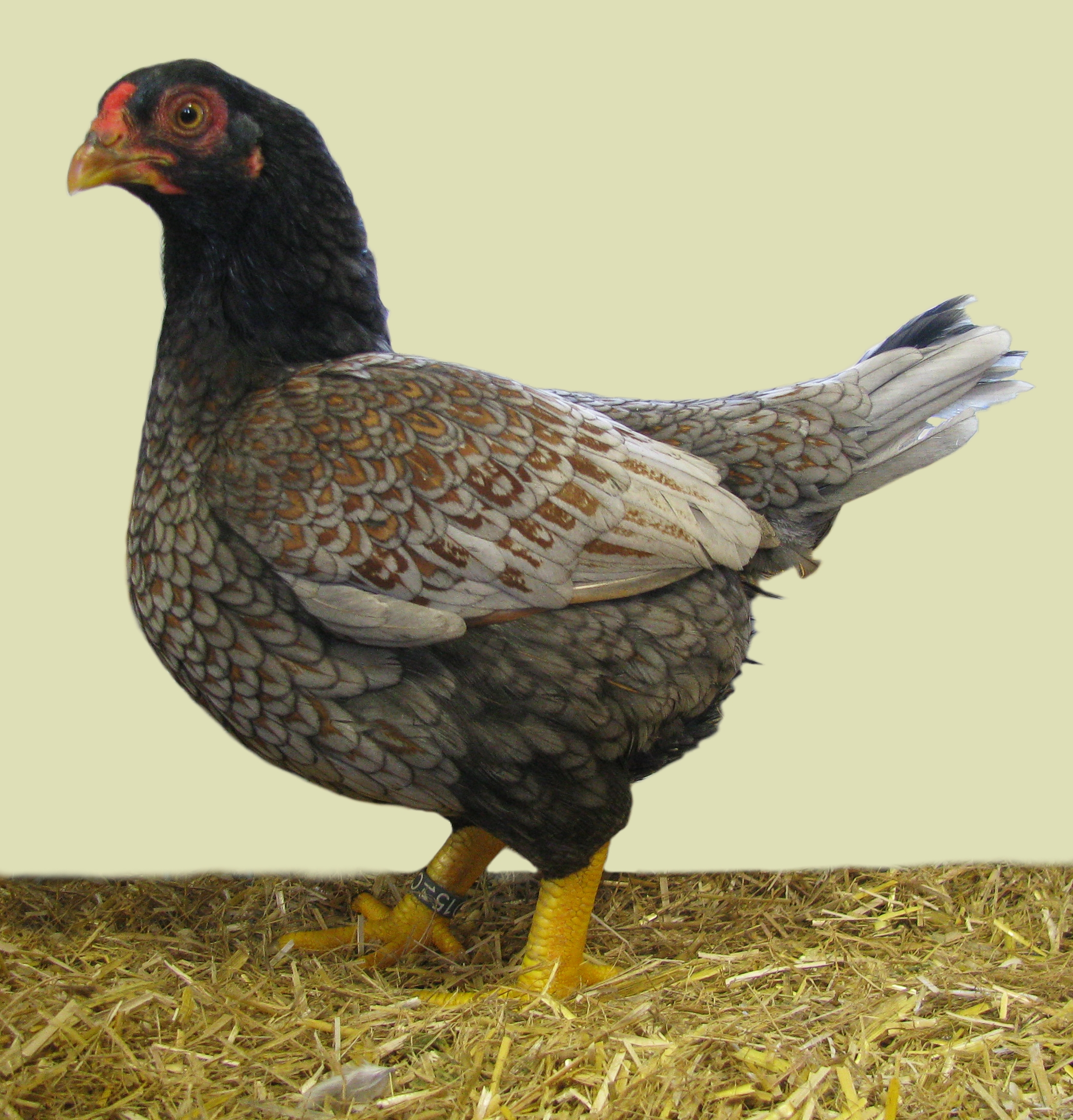
An Indian Game bantam hen

The Indian Game was developed by Sir Walter Gilbert, of Bodmin in Cornwall, in about 1820. It was intended to be a game-cock, but had no aptitude for cockfighting.

It is recognised as "Indian Game" in Australia, by the Poultry Club of Great Britain in the United Kingdom, and by the Entente Européenne in Europe. In the United States the name was changed in 1905 to "Cornish Indian Game", and then in 1910 to "Cornish". It was accepted by the American Poultry Association in 1893.

As for all native British poultry breeds, the conservation status of the Indian Game is listed on the watchlist of the Rare Breeds Survival Trust as "priority".

== Characteristics ==
The Indian Game is a large and stocky bird, short in the legs and unusually broad and deep in the breast. Some cock birds may be so short-legged and broad-breasted that they are incapable of reproducing.

Three colour variants are recognised in the United Kingdom: the dark, the original colour; the Jubilee; and the double-laced blue, which is rare. The Entente Européenne d'Aviculture et de Cuniculture and some European countries recognise the white and buff variants in addition to these three. In the United States, the Cornish is recognised in four colours: the original dark, added to the Standard of Perfection in 1893; the white, added in 1898; the white-laced red, added in 1909; and the buff, added in 1938.

It is resistant to most common diseases of poultry, but vulnerable to parasites. The feathers are thin and hard, without down; this may render the birds susceptible to cold, which may delay breeding in early Spring.

== Use ==
The Indian Game was bred as a game-cock, but was not successful as a fighting bird. It was found to be a good meat breed, and was much used for cross-breeding with established meat breeds such as the Dorking, the Orpington and the Sussex. It is a poor layer: the eggs are small and light brown; hens may lay about 80 per year.
