= Oyster (fowl) =

Select cut of poultry

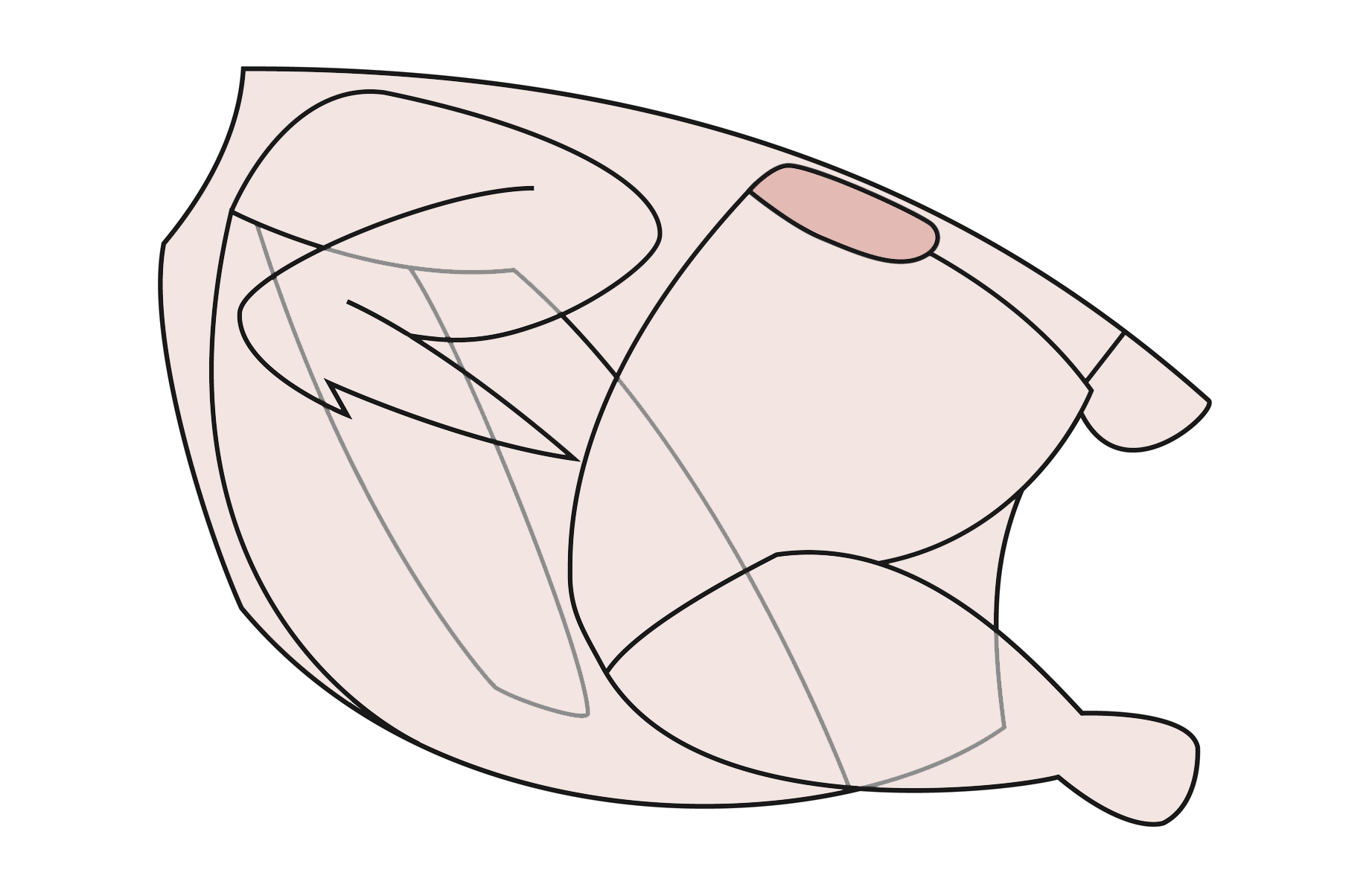
Position of the oysters in a chicken

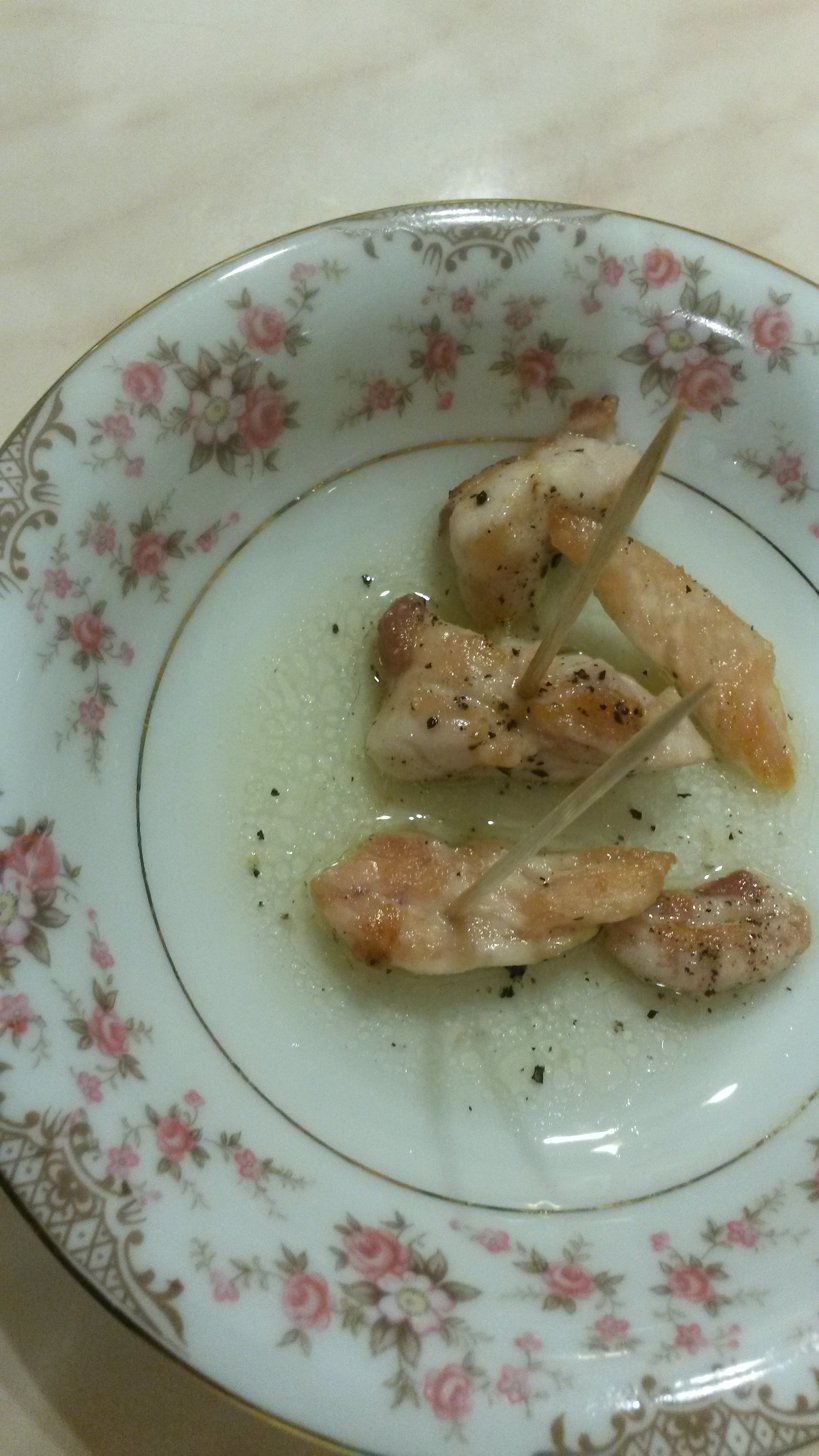
Chicken oysters prepared in sesame oil

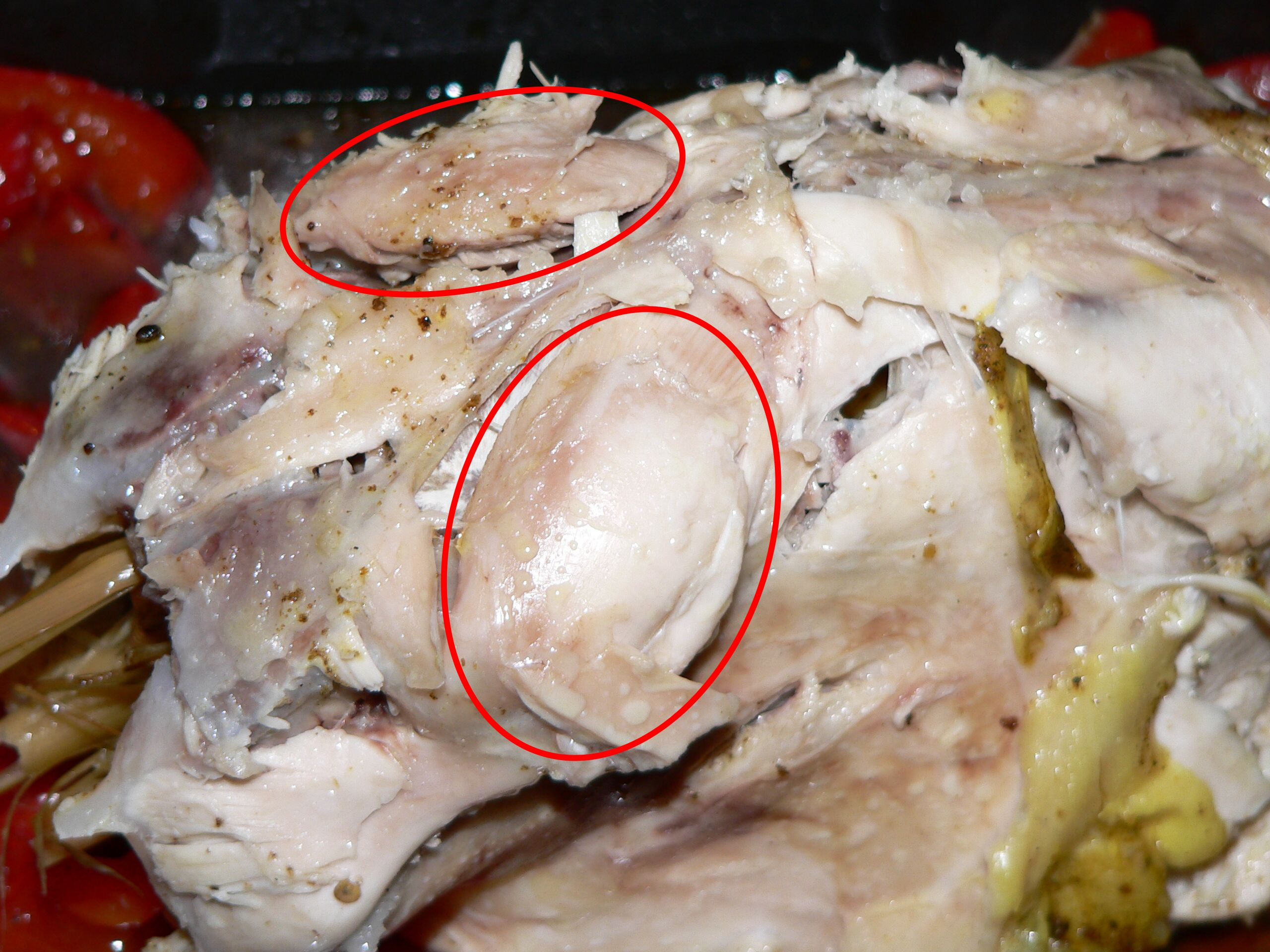
Chicken Oysters

Oysters are two small, round pieces of dark meat on the back of poultry near the thigh, in the hollow on the dorsal side of the ilium bone. The anatomical name of the muscle is iliotrochantericus caudalis.

In French, this part of the bird is called sot-l'y-laisse which translates, roughly, to "the fool leaves it there", as unskilled carvers sometimes accidentally leave it on the skeleton.
