= Cornish game hen =

Breed of chicken

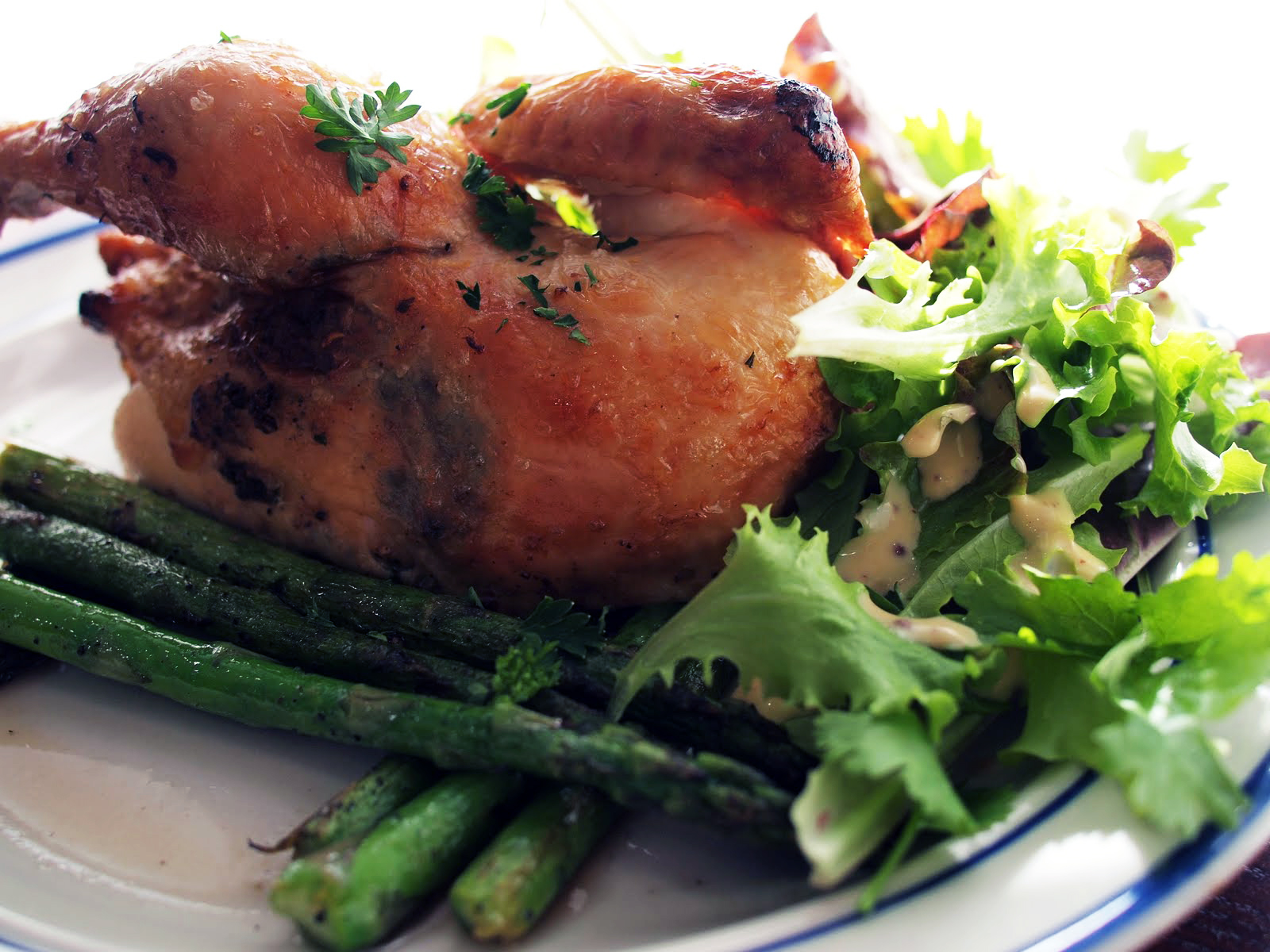
A roasted Cornish game hen

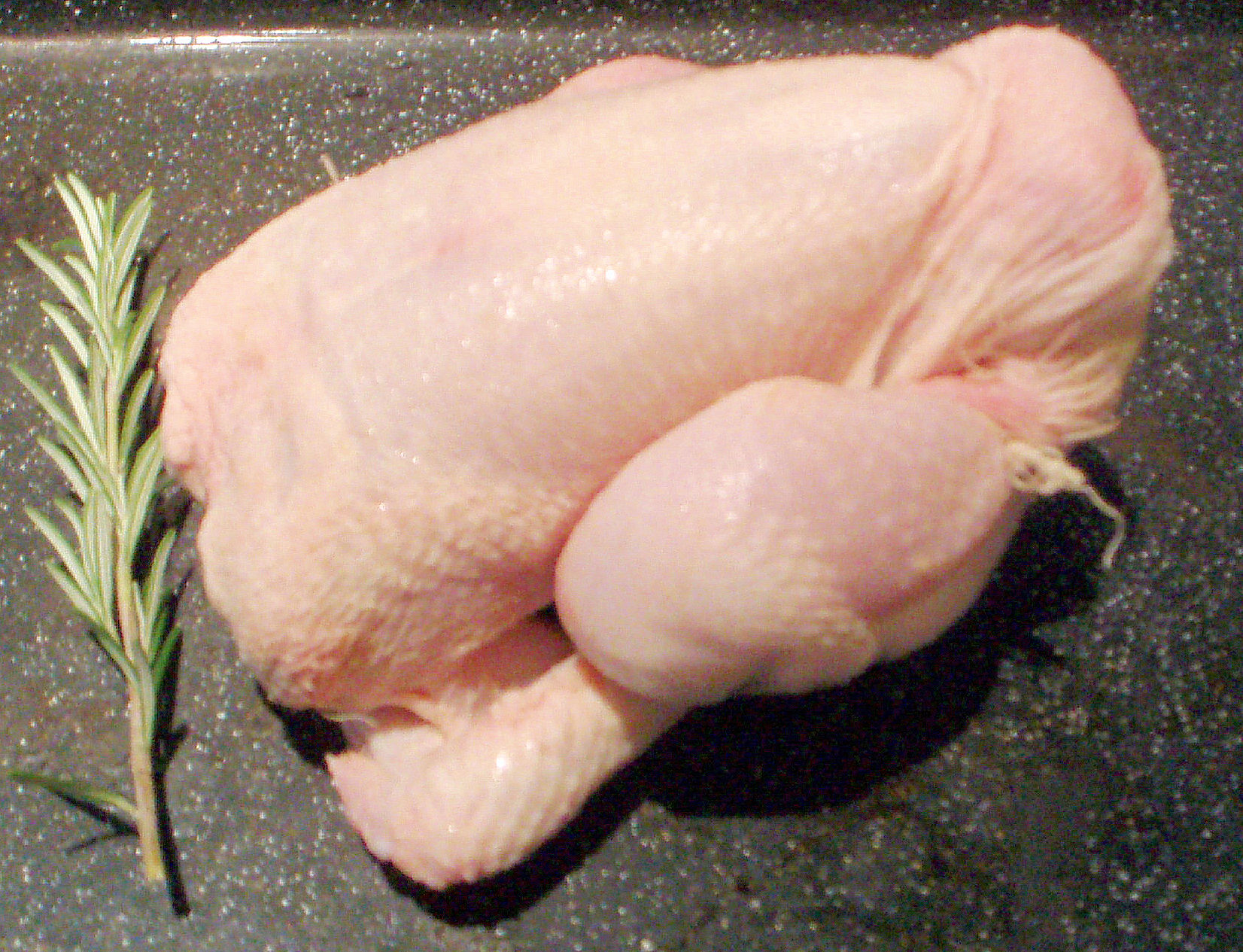
A Cornish game hen ready for the oven

Cornish game hen (also Rock Cornish game hen) is the USDA-approved name for a particular variety of broiler chicken, produced from a cross between the Cornish and White Plymouth Rock chicken breeds, that is served young and immature, weighing no more than two pounds (900 g) ready to cook.

Despite the name, the Cornish game hen is not a game bird. The name is doubly a misnomer because both males and females are served as Cornish game hens, meaning that many are not actually hens. Bred to develop a large breast over a short period of time, the fowl weighs roughly 2.5 pounds (1.1 kilograms) when slaughtered at four to six weeks of age and typically commands a higher price per pound than mature chicken. Adult Cornish game hens are not smaller than standard broiler chickens; the size of cooked Cornish game hens is due solely to the very young age at which they are slaughtered. The Cornish game hen is known for its tender meat, which absorbs marinades and seasonings readily.

== History ==
According to SFGate, The Saturday Evening Post credited Alphonsine "Therese" and Jacques Makowsky of Connecticut with developing the small fowl in the mid-1950s. The couple crossbred Cornish game cocks with other varieties of chicken and game bird, including the White Plymouth Rock hen and the Malayan fighting cock, to produce a succulent bird suitable for a single serving.

The pianist and comedian Victor Borge was an early investor in and promoter of the concept, leveraging his personal popularity to transform the dish from an exotic menu item into a common household meal.
