= Postnaturalism =

Postnaturalism is the theory of the postnatural, a term coined to describe organisms that have been intentionally and heritably altered by humans. Postnaturalism is a cultural process whereby organisms are bred to satisfy a specific cultural purpose. It can be used to read these organisms, which serve as insights into our culture by reflecting desires and beliefs prevalent at the time of breeding. This has direct implications for the evolutionary path of these organisms, whittling down undesirable traits to leave only those culturally sought out. Postnaturalism argues that in so doing, humans have and continue to actively alter the evolutionary path of a postnatural organism to suit our cultural desires. The agricultural practice of monoculture, for instance, is just one example of postnatural organisms who have been bred to such an extent that the modern-day species look nothing like their pre-neolithic counterparts. The breeding of these species for this purpose can be seen to be reflected in notable diet changes during this period, which proliferated during ensuing sedentism and urbanisation.

Postnaturalism is a highly selective process. For every organism that has become used in our society, there are countless more that have remained non-postnatural for whatever reason ranging from a perceived lack of future use from them or traits that make them too difficult to farm. One such example is the golden orb-weaver spider which produces a strong, light and useful silk, however they are known to be cannibalistic and thus impossible to farm on a large scale.

== Postnatural History ==
Postnatural history is defined as the "study of the origins, habitats, and evolution of organisms that have been intentionally and heritably altered by humans", which serves as a "record of the influence of human culture on evolution". So termed to differentiate it from traditional natural history studies, it is the subject of a storefront in Pittsburgh, United States called the Center for PostNatural History, which builds on this concept to produce an array of displays of organisms which are all postnatural.

== Domestication ==
The commencement of the postnatural can be considered to date back to prehistoric civilisation's early interaction with wild species. Here, domestication occurred as a way of adapting the environment around prehistoric people to suit their needs and desires through a gradual process of refinement. Domestication succeeds through the heritable continuation of an organism's phenotype and genotype allowing each generation to continue on from their previous generation. In its simplest terms, domestication alters a species through survival to a change in habitat, food source, or other significant change. These changes can be sought for a variety of different reasons including physical attributes, behavioural characteristics, lifespan, and adaptability to a change in environment.

It is thought human beings have been experimenting with selectively breeding organisms for around 10,000 years; over thousands of years humans have influenced many taxonomic groups, with bioengineering representing new forms of genetic information transfer, creation, and inheritance, coupled to climate change, scientists and policy makers are prioritising “ecosystem services” essential to humans, such as pollination, the replenishment of fish stocks, and a phenomenon being researched in the Great Barrier Reef being the terminal decline of coral.

== Selective breeding ==
Postnatural practices include selective breeding, a process by which humans purposefully breed certain organisms for particular biological traits. The practice was known to the Romans, and has been commonly used continuing to this day. Michael Pollan argues that Charles Darwin saw this process and considered it artificial, rather than natural, selection, but in terms of evolutionary progress this distinction becomes irrelevant to the species; the change is irreversible all the same. This is simply because evolution is understood to be unable to 'undo' previous changes, but, particularly in proteins, continues along in a progression of its biological structure depending on what traits are required for survival.

== Induced Mutation ==
Induced mutation in the context of postnaturalism is the process whereby a specific genetic mutation - usually a rare occurrence - is selectively isolated by people and encouraged to reproduce in future offspring. This differs from the general understanding of a mutation that was induced by treatment from a particular chemical agent in a living species.

A good example of this is the albino rat which possesses, in the wild a notoriously fatal genetic make-up making it much easier to identify to predators, a coat which drew interest in breeders so as to distinguish them from their more unhygienic-looking sewer counterparts prevalent in major cities in the 1800s. So numerous were rats in industrial cities, they became the subject of a sport based on their extermination, rat-baiting. The albino rat thus became distinguished from the regular unsightly sewer rat and even became sold as pets, the owning of one as a child allegedly the basis for Beatrix Potter's book Samuel Whiskers.

== Genetic Engineering ==
Genetic Engineering can be considered to be the purposeful alteration of the genetic makeup of an organism through the introduction of genes from sources not belonging to that organism. The isolation of a particular gene and introduction of another is often achieved through the use of biotechnology more broadly.

Genetic engineering is a contentious topic and even in searching for a definition, there are several alternatives available highlighting the variation in perceptions around what is considered to be the goal and process of genetic engineering. However, genetic engineering embodies much of what is considered postnatural, but doing so with the next level of technology than used in previous methods such as those mentioned in the above sections. Increased use of advanced technology allows for improved precision and accuracy of methods, and carrying out of transgenics, whilst the use of laboratories as settings is designed to prevent the release of experimented organisms into the wild unless cleared with the relevant protocols and regulations beforehand.

== Concerns over postnaturalism's proliferation in monoculture ==
The current agricultural practice of monoculture is intricately connected with postnaturalism, particularly now much of common contemporary agricultural practice has become mechanised. This mechanisation sometimes requires universality to comply with existing tools, machines and practices, such as the breeding of chickens to be a uniform size to ensure they fit into chicken harvesting machines. On other occasions rather than breed a particular species to a uniform size, some parts of organisms have been so heavily bred and altered that dystocia can regularly occur, such as with the Belgian Blue cattle whose birth canal regularly becomes constricted or even entirely blocked due to the birth canal's reduced size and the increased size of calves. The result is the routine scheduling of Caesarian sections.

== See also ==
- Monoculture
- Anthropocene
- Center for PostNatural History
- Culture
- Cultural artifact
- Natural environment
- Cobb 500
- Ross 308
