= Broiler industry =

Process by which broiler chickens are reared and prepared for meat consumption

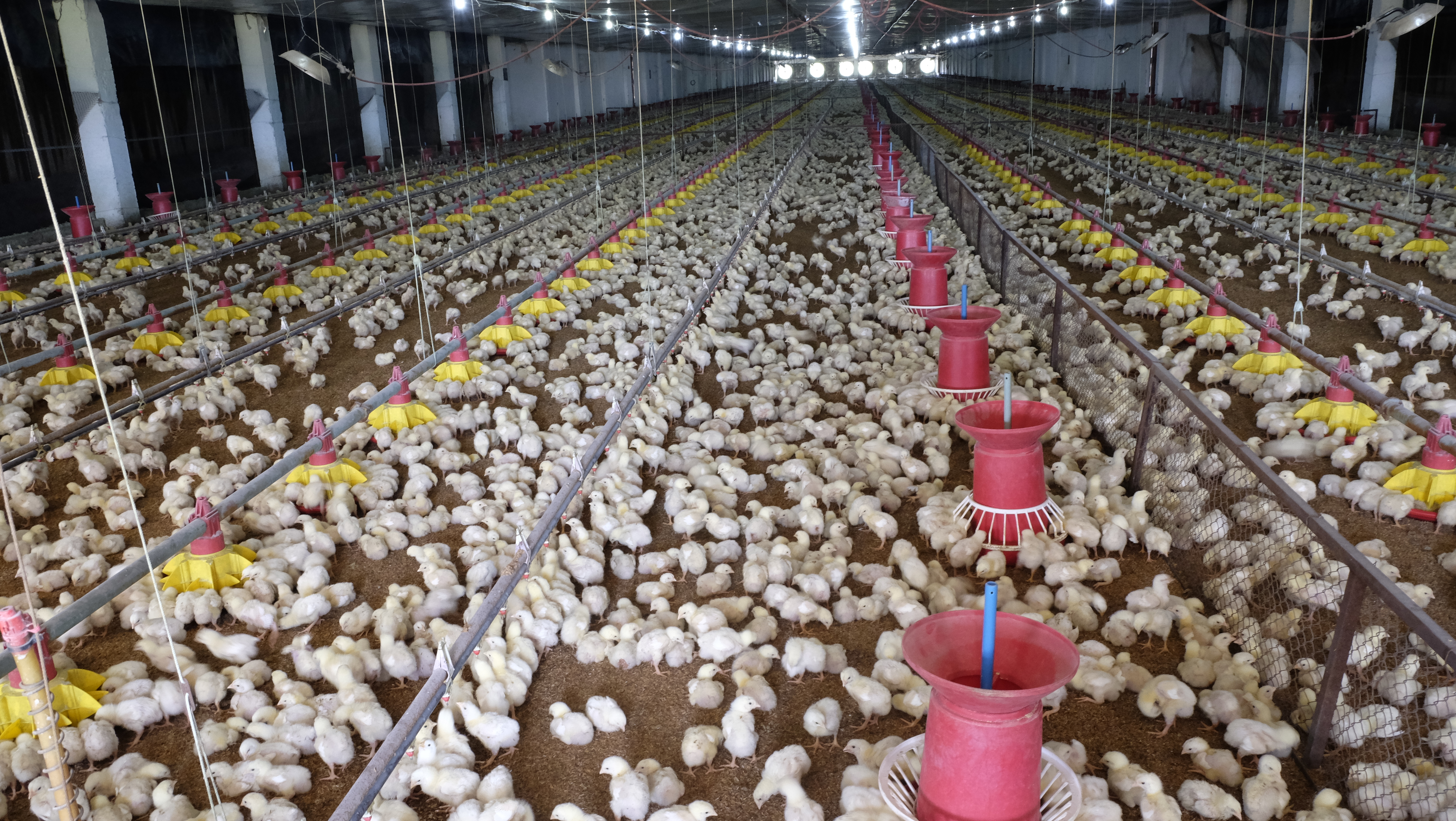
Broiler chicks

The broiler industry is the process by which broiler chickens are reared and prepared for meat consumption. Worldwide, in 2005 production was 71,851,000 tonnes. From 1985 to 2005, the broiler industry grew by 158%.

A key measure of performance is the feed conversion ratio (FCR), the ability to convert feed into edible product. In 2018 the FCR of broilers is about 1.5, or 1.5 kg of feed to produce 1 kg of meat. This compares very favorably with other sources of meat.

It is estimated that broilers produce 6 kg of greenhouse gas per 1 kg of meat, as compared to 60 kg GHG /kg for beef cattle.

In the 1980s, it was typical to produce a 2 kilogram chicken in 70 days. By 2018, this had reduced to just 29 days to produce a bird of the same weight.

== Broiler industry structure ==
The broiler production process is very much an industrial one. There are several distinct components of the broiler supply chain.

=== Primary breeding sector ===
The "primary breeding sector" consists of companies that breed pedigree stock. Pedigree stock ("pure line") is kept on high level biosecure farms. Eggs are hatched in a special pedigree hatchery and their progeny then goes on to the great-grandparent (GGP) and grandparent (GP) generations. These eggs would then go to a special GP hatchery to produce Parent Stock (PS) which passes to the production sector.

In 2006, out of an estimated world population of 18 billion poultry, about 3% are breeding stock. The US supplied about 1/4 of world GP stock.

Worldwide, the primary sector produced 417 million parent stock (PS) per year.

A single pedigree-level hen might have 25000 parent stock bird descendants, which in turn might produce 3 million broilers.

Numerous techniques are used to assess the pedigree stock. For example, birds might be examined with ultrasound or x-rays to study the shape of muscles and bones. The blood oxygen level is measured to determine cardiovascular health. The walking ability of pedigree candidates is observed and scored.

The need for high levels of Research and development spending prompted consolidation within the primary breeder industry. As of 2017, only two sizable breeding groups remained:

- Aviagen (with the Ross, Hubbard, Arbor Acres, Indian River and Peterson brands)
- Cobb-Vantress (with the Cobb, Avian, Sasso and Hybro brands)

In the UK, 2 international firms supply about 90% of the parent stock.

Due to the high levels of variation in the chicken genome, the industry has not yet reached biological limits to improved performance.

The full chicken genome was published in Nature, in December 2004. Today, all primary breeding groups are investing heavily in genomics research. This research mostly focuses on understanding the function and effect of genes already present in the breeding population. Research into transgenics — removing genes or artificially moving genes from one individual or species to another — has fewer prospects of gaining favor among consumers.

=== Broiler breeder farms ===
Broiler breeder farms raise parent stock which produce fertilized eggs. A broiler hatching egg is never sold at stores and is not meant for human consumption. The males and females are separate genetic lines or breeds, so that each line can be selected for optimal traits for productivity in either females or males, rather than a single line in which a compromise is reached between female and male optima. The chicks they produce will therefore be crossbreeds or "crosses". Since the birds are bred mainly for efficient meat production, producing eggs can be a challenge. In Canada, the average producer houses 15,000 birds that begin laying hatching eggs at 26 weeks of age. Each female bird will lay about 150 hatching eggs for the next 34 to 36 weeks, until the birds reach around 60 weeks of age and are slaughtered for meat. This cycle is then repeated when another flock of 20 week-old birds is put into the barns to begin the process again. As a general rule, each farmer produces enough broiler hatching eggs to supply chicks for 8 chicken producers. (Other sources indicate a parent hen will lay about 180 eggs in a 40-week production period.)

Generally, parent flocks are either owned by integrated broiler companies or hatcheries or are contracted to them on a long-term basis.

Broiler breeder growing is typically a two-stage process. Parent stock purchased from a primary breeder is delivered as day-old. Most are first placed with on specialist rearing houses or starter farms until approximately 18 weeks of age, when they will be moved to a laying farm. The starter farm has the specialized brooding equipment to raise the chicks.

==== Rearing house ====
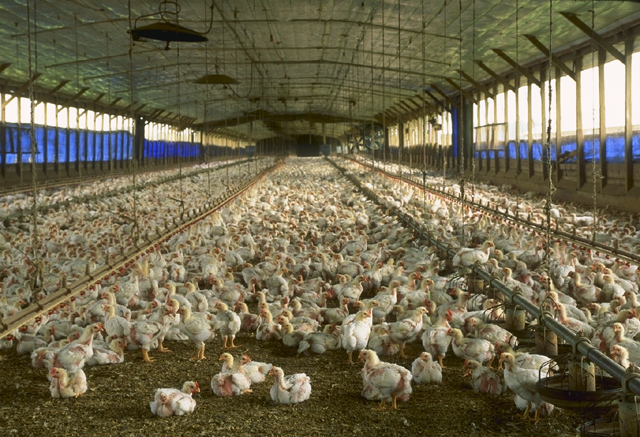
Florida chicken house

A typical rearing house (also called a shed/coup or barn) design for Alabama-like climate (100 °F (38 °C) in summer and 20 °F (−7 °C) in winter):

- 40 by 400 feet (12 m × 122 m) size, single storey.
- 11,000 bird capacity (about 1.4 ft^{2} (0.13 m^{2}) per bird)
- Ceiling is insulated
- Exterior curtain side walls.
- A "minimum ventilation" system is required for the heating period to provide a certain amount of fresh air.
- A separate "tunnel ventilation" system with evaporative pad cooling is desired (minimum wind speed is 400 fpm) for hot weather in the later stage of the bird's growth.
- Air inlets may be automatically adjusted.
- A negative ventilation system helps keep dirt and dust out of egg storage areas.
- The entire house may be heated, or individual "brooders" may be used.
- The floor is flat. There are no "slats" or "pits" for manure. There are no cages, and no nests. "Litter" (shavings or straw) covers the floor. When the chicks are introduced temporary barriers are used to keep them close to the heated areas.
- "Black-out" design to keep out external light, so the day-night cycle can be controlled.
- An automatic timer-controlled lighting system. Dimmers allow light intensity to be adjusted.
- Automatic feeders to distribute feed. Typically this consists of an endless chain in a trough or with individual pans. A silo or bin outside provides storage.
- Automatic drinkers provide water. There are several different designs, with "nipples" or "round" drinkers being popular.
- Feeders and drinkers are height adjusted as the birds grow, and can be raised on chains or wires to allow cleanout of the barn.

Chicks require warm air temperatures, which is reduced as the birds mature:

Age	Brooder Temperature	Whole-House Heating Temperature
0 days	34–35 °C (93–95 °F)	31–32 °C (88–90 °F)
14 days	31–32 °C (88–90 °F)	24–25 °C (75–77 °F)

Chicks might be debeaked at 7–10 days age. During rearing, bird weight is carefully monitored, as an over-weight bird will be a poor egg producer. The feed mix will be adjusted to meet nutritional needs at each stage. Feed might be restricted to control body weight, for example with "skip a day" feeding, or feeding 5 days out of 7. A vaccination program is carried out, which ensures the longevity of the parent stock, and the immunity may be passed to the broiler progeny. Males (cockerels) and females (pullets), are usually raised separately.

==== Laying house ====
The birds are then moved to broiler breeder laying houses or production barns. The birds are typically placed into crates, and transported by truck to a separate facility. Males and females are raised together at this point. Outwardly the laying house will resemble the rearing house. Inside, about one-half of the floor might consist of raised 'slats.' During the production run, manure will drop through the slats and accumulate in the pit underneath the slats. The birds are not generally caged, especially since the roosters must mate with the hens to fertilize the eggs. Nests are provided for laying hens. Both automatic and manual (example) nesting systems exist. Manual nests are usually stuffed with straw or shavings and eggs are hand-collected. Automatic systems usually have a plastic carpet lining, with a conveyor belt for egg collection. Careful layout and attention to bird behavior is required to avoid 'floor eggs'.

Depending on breed, egg production starts at 24–26 weeks of age. Production percentage (daily eggs per hen) climbs rapidly to a peak of 80–85% at 29–32 weeks, and then gradually declines with age. Hatchability tends to peak (at perhaps 90%) somewhat later than production at 34–36 weeks. Overall flock production will decline as mortality reduces the size of the flock and as the birds age out of their prime.

When the rooster mates with the hen, sperm enter the hen's oviduct and are stored within sperm storage glands. These glands can store more than half a million sperm, and sperm can remain viable for up to 3 weeks. However, a hen will have maximum fertility for only about 3 to 4 days after one mating. Therefore, the male-to-female ratio in a flock must be enough to ensure mating of every hen every 3 days or so. To maintain fertility, younger roosters may be introduced as the flock ages- a system known as 'spiking'.

Eggs are collected a minimum of twice a day, and usually more frequently. Cracked or dirty eggs are separated, as they are not suitable for hatching. Undersized, oversized or double-yolk eggs are also unsuitable. The eggs might be disinfected by fumigation, are packed in 'flats' or trays, placed in wheeled trolleys, and stored in a cool (15-18C) climate-controlled area. The egg packing room and storage rooms are kept segregated to reduce contamination. The trolleys are delivered by truck to a hatchery perhaps twice a week.

At the end of the production cycle, the birds are called "spent fowl". Disposal of spent fowl may be a problem as consumer demand for them is poor.

=== Hatcheries ===
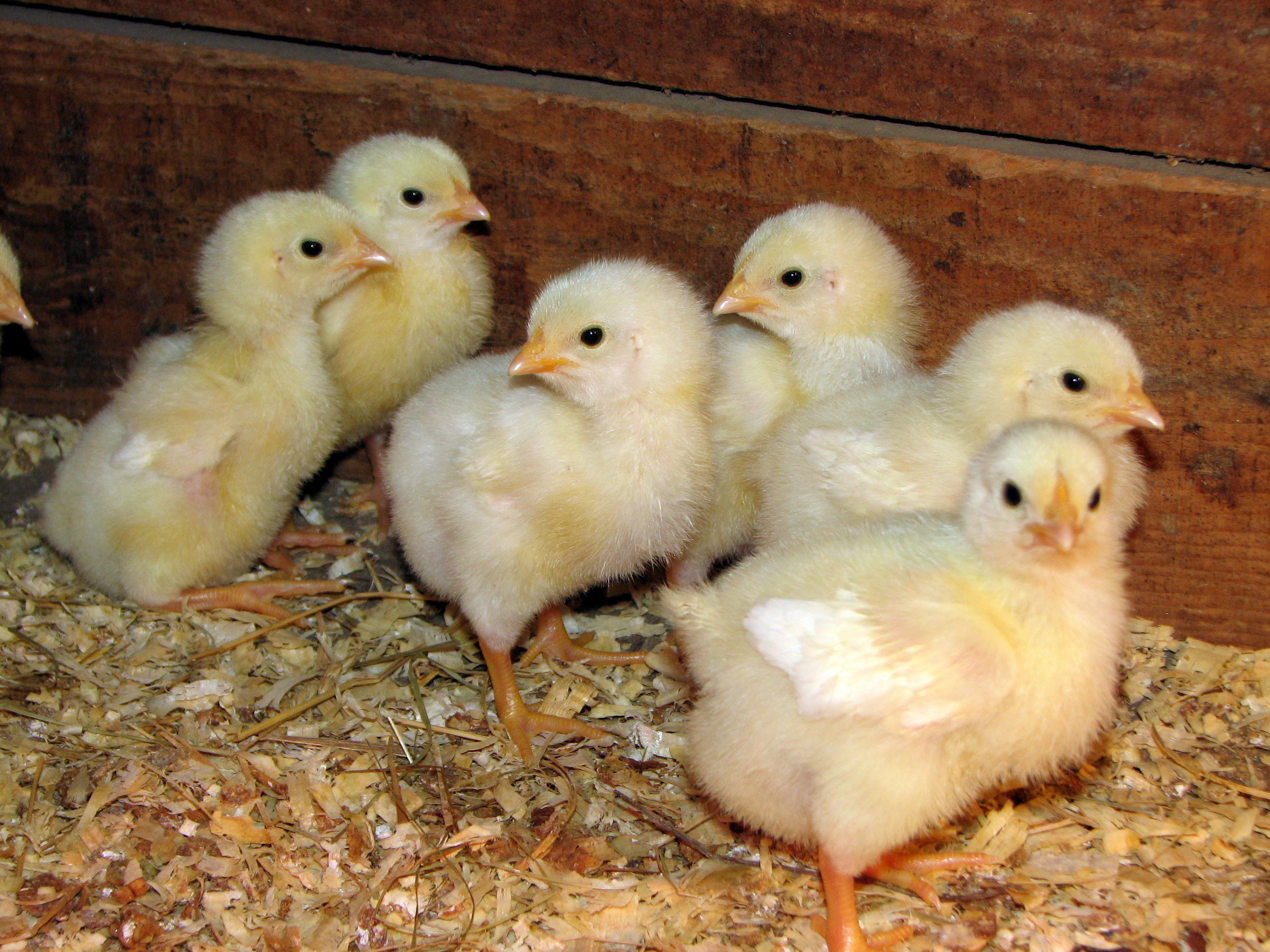
Five-day-old broiler strain Cornish-Rock chicks

Hatcheries take the fertilized eggs, incubate them, and produce day-old broiler chicks.

Incubation takes about 21 days, and is often a two-step process. Initial incubation is done in machines known as setters. A modern setter is the size of a large room, with a central corridor and racks on either side. Eggs are held relatively tightly (large end up) in trays, which are stored in the racks. Inside the setter, temperature and humidity are closely maintained. Blowers or fans circulate air to ensure uniform temperature, and heating or cooling is applied as needed by automated controls. The racks pivot or tilt from side to side, usually on an hourly basis. As an example, one commercial machine can hold up to 124,416 eggs and measures about 4.7 metres wide by 7.2 metres deep. Setters often hold more than one hatch, on a staggered hatch-day basis, and operate continuously. The setter phase lasts about 18 days.

On or about day 18, the eggs are removed from the setters and transferred to hatchers. These machines are similar to setters, but have larger flat-bottom trays, so the eggs can rest on their sides, and newly hatched chicks can walk. Having a separate machine helps keep hatching debris out of the setter. The environmental conditions in the hatcher are optimized to help the chicks hatch. As a commercial example, a large hatcher has capacity for 15,840 eggs, and measures about 3.3 metres by 1.8 metres.

Some incubators are single-stage (combining setter and hatcher functions), and entire trolleys of eggs can be rolled in at one time. One advantage of single-stage machines is that they are thoroughly cleaned after each hatch, whereas a setter is rarely shutdown for cleaning. The single-stage environment can be adjusted for eggs from different producing flocks, and for each step of the hatch cycle. The setter environment is often a compromise as different egg batches are in the machine at one time.

On hatch day (day 21), the trays are removed ("pulled") from the hatchers, and then the chicks are removed from the trays. Chicks are inspected, with the sickly ones being disposed of. Chicks may be by vaccinated, sorted by sex, counted, and placed in chick boxes. Stacks of chick boxes are loaded into trucks for transport, and arrive at the broiler farm on the same day. Specialized climate-controlled trucks are typically used, depending on climate and transport distance.

Chick sexing is optionally done to improve uniformity – since males grow faster, the weights are more uniform if males and females are raised separately. The birds are bred so that males and females have unique feather patterns or color differences. Unlike egg-laying poultry, males are not culled.

Typical hatchability rate in Canada in 2011 was 82.2%. (i.e. 82.2% of eggs set for incubation produced a saleable chick). A UK source estimates 90% hatchability.

=== Broiler farms ===
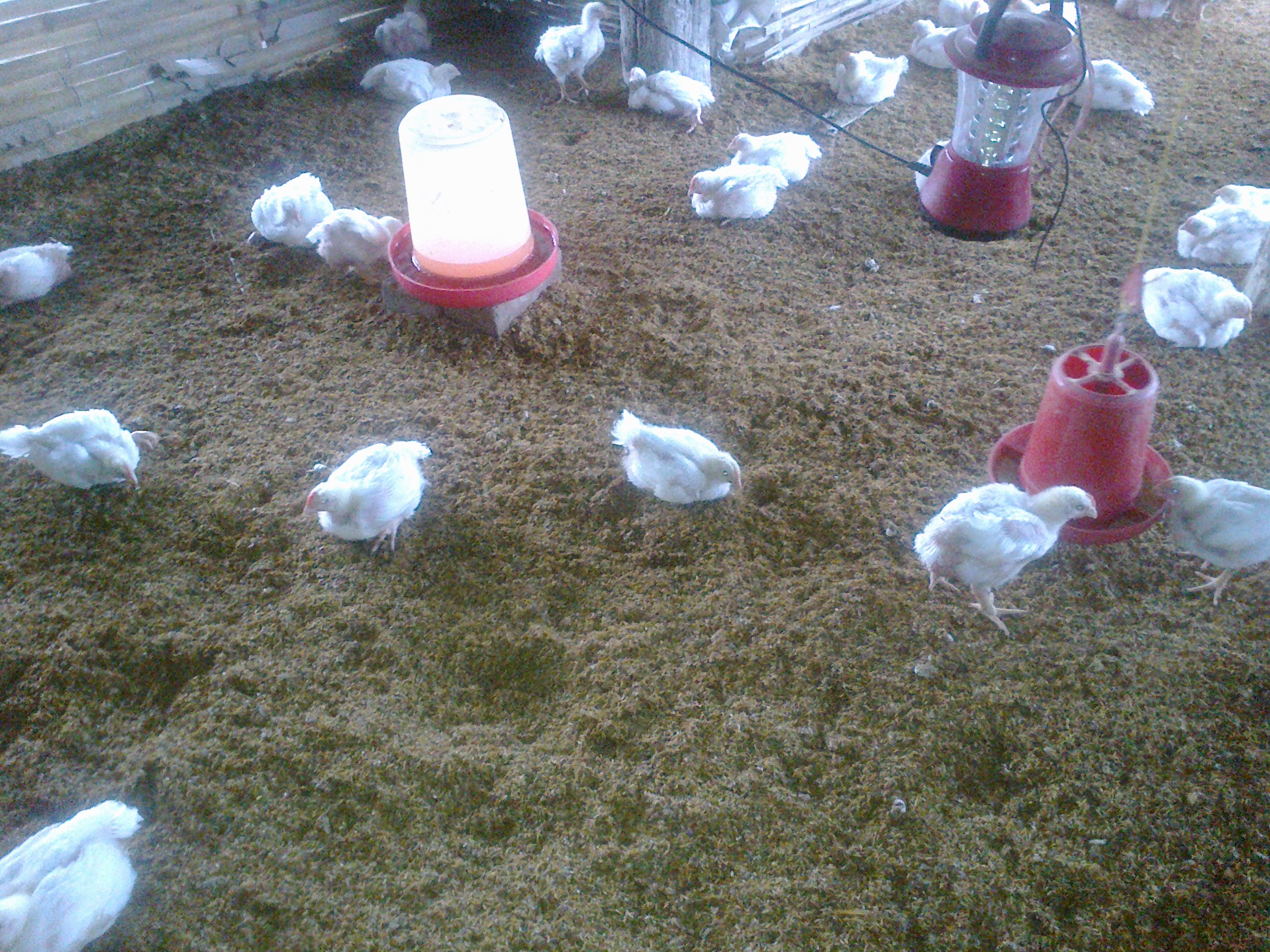
Broiler chickens in a farm

The chicks are delivered to the actual broiler Grow-Out farms. In the US, houses may be up to 60' x 600' (36000 sq.ft.). One 2006 magazine survey reported a desired 67-foot wide house, with the average 'standard' new house being 45' x 493', with largest being 60' x 504'. One farm complex may have several houses.

In Mississippi, typical farms now have four to six houses with 25,000 birds per house. One full-time worker might manage three houses. On average, a new broiler house is about 500 feet long by 44 feet wide and costs about $200,000 equipped.

When the birds are full-grown, they are caught (perhaps with a chicken harvester) placed in crates, and transported by truck to a processing plant.

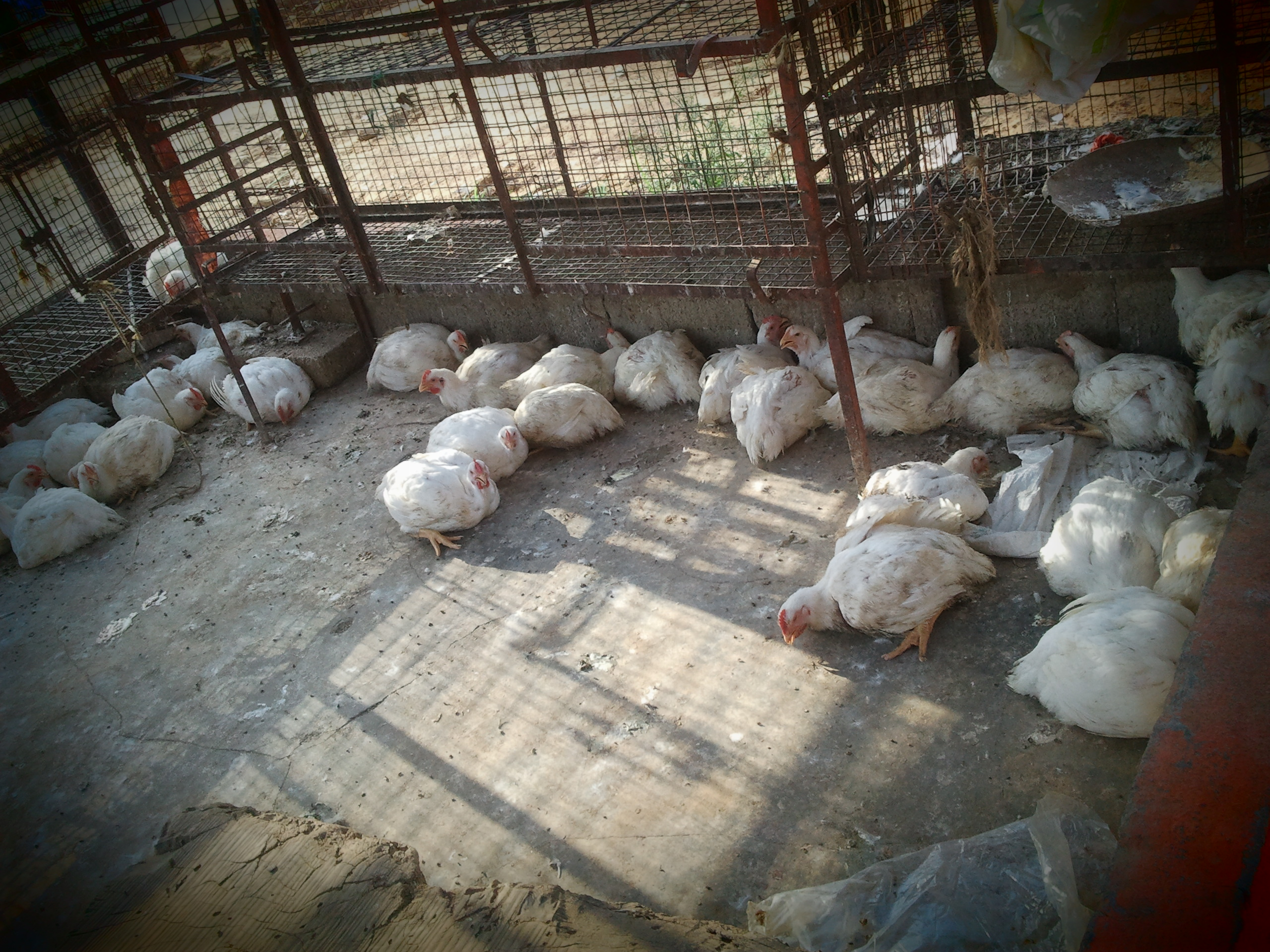
Broiler chickens kept outside near a chicken shop in India

Because of their efficient meat conversion, broiler chickens are also popular in small family farms in rural communities, where a family will raise a small flock of broilers.

=== Processing plants ===
When the birds are large enough, they are shipped to processing plants for slaughter. When chickens arrive at the processor they go through the following sequence:

- Removed from transport cages
- Hung by the legs on a shackle, mounted on a conveyor chain.
- Stunned using an electrically charged water bath
- Killed by cutting the blood vessels in the neck
- Bled so that most blood has left the carcass
- Scalded to soften the attachment of the feathers
- Plucked to remove the feathers
- Head removed
- Hock cutting to remove the feet
- Rehung in the evisceration room
- Gutted or eviscerated to remove the internal organs
- Washed to remove blood and soiling from the carcass
- Chilled to prevent bacterial spoiling (They go through a chiller which takes approximately 2 hours to go through. The chiller generally holds thousands of gallons of water kept below 40 degrees Fahrenheit.)
- Drained to allow excess water to drip off the carcass
- Weighing
- Cut selection to divide the carcass into desired portion (breast, drumsticks etc.)
- Packed (for example in plastic bags) to protect carcasses or cuts
- Chilled or frozen for preservation

Further Processing plants carry out operations such as cutting and deboning. Previously the conveyor belts carrying live chickens generally ran at a maximum of 140 chickens per minute, but the maximum speed has been increased to 175 birds/minute. Once the dead birds arrive in the evisceration room (usually dropped down a chute after the feet are removed), they are hung again on shackles much the same way as they were when they were alive.

=== Integrators ===
Today, in the U.S. an individual company called an "integrator" performs all or most production aspects. Integrators generally own breeder flocks, hatcheries, feed mills, and processing plants. The integrators provide the chicks, feed, medication, part of the fuel for brooding, and technical advisers to supervise farm production. Integration reduces costs by coordinating each stage of production.

As an example of scale, a planned Tyson plant in Kansas was to have 1600 workers at the processing plant, with capacity to process 1.25 million birds per week. The plant was budgeted at $320 million. They expected to have between 100 and 200 farms within a 50-mile radius. There would be about 6 barns per site, to limit disease spread. Hourly wages were projected to be between $13 and $15.

== U.S. industry history ==
In the 1920s–1930s, broiler production was initiated in locations such as the Delmarva Peninsula, Georgia, Arkansas, and New England. Cecile Long Steele of Sussex County, Delaware, is often cited as the pioneer of the commercial broiler industry. In 1923, she raised a flock of 500 chicks intended to be sold for meat. Her business was so profitable that by 1926 she was able to build a 10,000 bird broiler house.

In 1945, A&P organized the first of its Chicken of tomorrow contests. Qualifying trials were conducted in 1946 and 1947 with the national finals held in 1948. Breeders submitted a case of 30 dozen hatching eggs to a hatchery, the eggs were hatched, the offspring raised until they reached market weight and were then slaughtered. Broilers were judged on several factors, including growth rate, feed conversion efficiency, and the amount of meat on breasts and drumsticks. Though held only three times, the contests enabled breeders such as Peterson, Vantress, Cobb, Hubbard, Pilch and Arbor Acres to become established market brands.

During the 1940s – 1960s, feed mills, hatcheries, farms, and processors were all separate entities. Hatcheries were driven to co-ordinate activities to protect their market share and production. Later, feed mills extended credit to farmers to purchase feed to produce the live chickens. Eventually entrepreneurs consolidated feed mill, hatchery and processing operations, resulting in the beginnings of the integrated industry.

Chickens were typically sold "New York dressed," with only the blood and feathers removed. In 1942, an Illinois plant was the first to win government approval of "on-line" evisceration. Evisceration and ice-packing of ready-to-cook whole carcasses became the norm. In 1949, USDA launched a voluntary program of grading. Federal inspection of broilers became mandatory in 1959.

By 1952, "broilers" surpassed farm chickens as the number one source of chicken meat in the United States.

By the mid-1960s, ninety percent of broilers produced came from vertical integrated operations, which combined production, processing and marketing.

In the late 1960s and early 1970s, major companies used television and print media to market chickens under brand names. Today, 95 percent of broilers sold at retail grocery stores carry a brand name.

By the early 1980s, consumers preferred cut-up and further-processed chickens to the traditional whole bird.

Chicken passed pork consumption in 1985. Chicken consumption surpassed beef consumption in 1992.

	Historic	Modern
Number of Hatcheries	11,405 (1934)	323 (2001)
Incubator Capacity	276 million eggs (1934)	862 million eggs (2001)
Hatchery Average Incubation Capacity	24,224 eggs (1934)	2.7 million eggs (2001)
Annual Broiler Production	366 million broilers (1945)	8.4 billion broilers (2001)
Average live weight	3.03 pounds (1945)	5.06 pounds (2001)
Live weight price	36 cents per pound (1948)	39.3 cents per pound (2001)
Feed Conversion Efficiency Feed conversion ratio	4.70 lbs feed per lb live weight (1925)	1.83 lbs feed per lb live weight (2017)
Mortality	18% (1925)	4.5% (2017)

=== Breeding Companies ===
Cobb claims to be world's oldest poultry breeding company. Founded 1916 when Robert C. Cobb Senior purchased a farm in Littleton, Massachusetts, forming Cobb's Pedigreed Chicks. Purchased by Upjohn in 1974. Sold to Tyson Foods in 1994.

EW Group is a German multinational livestock breeding group. The EW Group comprises multiple companies including Aviagen, Hubbard, Arbor Acres, Peterson, Hy-Line International and H&N International.

- Hubbard was founded by Oliver Hubbard in 1921 in Walpole, New Hampshire. Acquired by Merck in 1974. In 1997 Hubbard was spun off and merged with the ISA-group from France as part of Merial. In 2003, split from ISA, while keeping the broiler lines from ISA and Shaver. Sold by Merial to Groupe Grimaud in 2005. Since 2018 part of the EW Group.
- Arbor Acres was originally a family farm, started by Italian immigrant Frank Saglio who purchased a Glastonbury, Connecticut farm in 1917. He started raising chickens in abandoned piano crates. His third son Henry Saglio took over the poultry while in grade eight. Henry began trying to breed a white bird, because black pinfeathers were more visible if missed during plucking. In 1948, and again in 1951, Arbor Acres White Rocks won in the purebred category of the Chicken of Tomorrow competition. The white feathered Arbor Acres birds were preferred to the higher performing dark feathered Red Cornish crosses. In 1964, Nelson Rockefeller purchased Arbor Acres making it part of International Basic Economy Corporation (IBEC). Joint ventures were formed in Thailand, Taiwan, Indonesia, India, the Philippines, and Japan. In 1980, IBEC merged with Booker McConnell Limited of Great Britain. Booker owned all of "AA" by 1991. At this time Arbor Acres had grown to become the world's largest broiler breeding company, with customers in over 70 countries. AA was divested in 2000, eventually acquired by Aviagen.
- Peterson was founded in Decatur, Arkansas by Lloyd Peterson. He began experimenting with breeding in his garage in the 1940s. During the 1960s and 1970s the "Peterson Male" rooster held about 90% of US domestic share and 40% of the world market for breeding males. Aviagen purchased the genetic lines in 2010.

Shaver started with 2 hens in 1932 by Donald Shaver. Mainly focused on laying hens, Shaver launched a broiler product in 1958. Cargill purchased part of Shaver in 1964, which helped give Shaver a toehold in the US market. In the early 1970s the market share in the US was around 8-10%. Cargill bought all of Shaver in 1985. Shaver was acquired by ISA in 1988, and then made part of Merial. The layer business kept the Shaver name, and was sold as Natexis Industrie in 2003, and then to Hendrix in 2005.

== Industry statistics ==
=== World ===
Worldwide, from 1985 to 2005, the broiler industry grew by 158%. Major increases were experienced by:

- China +591%
- Brazil +482%
- US +147%
- Thailand +141%
- EU-25 +73%.

In 2005 world production was 71,851,000 tonnes. Major producers were:

- United States 15,869,000 tonnes
- China 10,196,000 tonnes
- EU-25 8,894,000 tonnes
- Brazil 8,668,000 tonnes

In 2005, world exports of chicken meat $8.3 billion (CAD). Largest exporters were Brazil ($4 billion), the United States ($2.6 billion) and the EU-25 ($0.82 billion). The largest importers of chicken meat were: Japan ($1 billion), Russia ($943.3 million), Germany ($800.6 million) and China ($598.8 million).

=== United States ===
In 2010, approximately 36.9 billion pounds (16,737,558 tonnes) of broilers were sold, for a retail value of $45 billion, based on retail weight sold multiplied by the retail composite price. In 2010, the US exported 6.8 billion pounds, valued at $3.1 billion, about 18% of production.

In 2009, the US produced 8.6 billion birds. The top 3 states were Georgia, Arkansas and Alabama, each producing over 1 billion birds. Farm receipts were about $22 billion.

There are fewer than 50 highly specialized, vertically integrated agribusiness firms that dominate the industry. The top 10 integrators produce about 60% of U.S. broilers.

In 2001, there were 323 chicken hatcheries, with an incubator capacity of 862 million eggs. The average capacity per hatchery was 2.7 million eggs.

In 2010 the largest producers were Tyson Foods (161 million ready to cook pounds) and Pilgrim's Pride (126.5 million pounds). The next largest producer, Perdue Farms, is less than half the size of Pilgrims Pride.

=== Canada ===
Canada has a supply management system where marketing boards govern the broiler and broiler hatching egg industries. For broilers, prices are negotiated at the provincial level. In each province, the minimum price per kg that processors will pay to producers is set periodically through negotiations between processors and the provincial marketing board. From 1992 to 2003, negotiated prices in Ontario are generally used as a benchmark when conducting price negotiations in other provinces. In Ontario, Chicken Farmers of Ontario (CFO) has price-negotiating authority. It negotiates the base price paid by primary processors for live chicken with primary processors. Since 2003, the live chicken price is determined by a “live price formula” established by the Agriculture, Food, and Rural Affairs Appeals Tribunal that includes the price of chicks, feed and producer margin.

Broiler hatching egg production consists of 270 producers generating about $188.3 million in 2005. Canada produced about 675 million hatching eggs, and imported about 121 million.

There were 66 hatcheries in Canada, of which 20 were mixed, producing both broiler and layer chicks. The main companies involved in broiler hatching eggs and chicks are:

- Maple Leaf Foods Incorporated,
- Lilydale Hatchery,
- Maple Lodge,
- Couvoir Boire & Frères Inc
- Western Hatchery Limited.

The average price per chick was about $0.35. Canada imported about 13 million broiler chicks.

There were 2786 regulated chicken producers, generating farm cash receipts of $1.6 billion in 2005. Compared to other livestock sectors (i.e. beef, dairy, and pork), the poultry and egg industry was the healthiest with regards to total income for the average operator.

In 2005, total chicken slaughters were 973.9 million kilograms. Of this, 35.2 million kg were mature (non-broiler)slaughters, meaning about 96% of chicken consumption was broilers. By revenue, chicken processing is about 1/4 of the meat packing business. The top 8 processors account 66% of the market.

In 2005 there were 175 primary poultry processing plants. The five largest firms are, in order:

1. la Coopérative fédérée de Québec (three plants in Québec),
2. Lilydale Poultry Co-operative (one plant in British Columbia, three in Alberta and one in Saskatchewan),
3. Maple Leaf Poultry (two plants in Ontario, one in Alberta and one in Nova Scotia),
4. Exceldor (two plants in Québec) and
5. Maple Lodge Farms (one plant in Ontario).

There are 376 plants that do further processing, involving canning, boning and cutting.

Chicken consumption by market sector	Consumption (000,000 kg)
Retail (Grocery Stores, Butcher Shops)	625
Fast Food	231
Full Serve Restaurants	97
Hotels, Institutions	55
Total	1008

The Canadian Food Inspection Agency (CFIA), is a Federal Government Agency tasked with regulating food safety, animal and plant health, to set standards and carry out enforcement and inspection. Activities range from the inspection of federally registered meat processing facilities to border inspections for foreign pests and diseases, to the enforcement of practices related to fraudulent labelling. The CFIA also verifies the humane transportation of animals, conducts food investigations and recalls, and performs laboratory testing and environmental feeds.

The Canadian On-Farm Food Safety Recognition Program is administered by the CFIA and helps national industry associations develop and implement food safety programs. Several key industries have science-based, programs consistent with the Hazard Analysis Critical Control Points (HACCP, "hass ap") standards.

== See also ==
- Chicken
- Chickens as pets
- Chicken tax
- Cobb 500
- Concentrated Animal Feeding Operation (CAFO)
- Factory farming
- Poultry farming
- Ross 308
- The Chicken of Tomorrow
- Welfare of broiler chickens
