= White striping =

Condition in poultry

White striping (abbreviated WS) is a condition in poultry where white fat deposits replace muscle in stripes along muscle fibers. It is considered a type of myopathy, primarily of the pectoralis major muscle. There does not appear to be direct harm to birds specifically from white striping. However, some scientists and animal welfare groups have called its presence indicative of the industry's use of fast-growing birds, who have higher rates of health issues and welfare concerns such as hock burns. Using fast-growing birds is linked to overall higher rates of white striping.

== Prevalence ==
Over the last decade, the rates of white striping have increased substantially. In 2012, multiple studies averaged around 5% of birds showing signs of white striping. In 2018 and 2019, studies averaged above at least 90%. In 2021, one group found that it showed up around 99% of all farmed birds in the US, with 70% being moderate to severe.

The condition is not limited to the United States. In Italy, France, Spain, and Brazil, up to 50% of chicken breasts contained white striping according to research from 2014 to 2016. While data is not always available for every country, researchers suggest it is likely to appear at a higher prevalence in countries with fast-growing birds. It is also suggested that prevalence of white striping is likely higher than what the industry reports.

== Cause ==
The exact cause is not fully known. It is hypothesized that hypoxia and oxidative stress play a role in the emergence of the condition. Other hypotheses include higher calcium levels in the tissue between cells and the muscle fibers changing type.

It is known that birds genetically selected to grow faster show higher rates of white striping, regardless of their diet. Compared to a more moderately growing bird, the fast-growing Ross 308 shows an 11–25 times increase, and the Cobb 500 shows a 24–28 times increase. The exact mechanism behind that connection is still an area of open research.

== Effects ==
In severe cases of white striping, one study found it results in 223% higher fat and a 9% reduction in the protein of chicken. Moderate cases result in 87% higher fat and a 3% reduction in protein. Additionally, birds with white striping show worsened quality of protein.

== See also ==
- Woody breast
