= Woody breast =

Condition impacting chicken meat

Woody breast is an abnormal muscle condition that impacts the texture and usability of chicken breast meat. The affected meat is described as tough, chewy, and gummy due to stiff or hardened muscle fibers that spread through the filet. The specific cause is not known but may be related to factors associated with rapid growth rates. Companies often use a three-point scale to grade the woodiness of a particular breast. Although distasteful to many, meat that exhibits woody breast is not known to be harmful to humans who consume it. When detected by suppliers, product shown to have the condition present may be discounted or processed as ground chicken. Woody breast has become so prevalent in the broiler industry that the U.S. Poultry & Egg Association has helped fund four research projects with over $250,000 in an effort to understand and address the condition. Estimates placed the total cost to the global industry as high as US$1 billion in 2020 for losses associated with managing the woody breast condition in broiler chickens.

There are urgent needs in the global poultry industry for rapid detection and sorting of product with woody breast using nondestructive methods. Current detection technologies include hyperspectral imaging, accelerometers, and bio-electrical impedance.

== See also ==
- White striping

== General references ==
- "What is "woody breast"? Is woody breast caused by bigger, faster-growing chickens?". 13 April 2016.
- Greene, Elizabeth; Cauble, Reagan; Dhamad, Ahmed E.; Kidd, Michael T.; Kong, Byungwhi; Howard, Sara M.; Castro, Hector F.; Campagna, Shawn R.; Bedford, Mike; Dridi, Sami (4 August 2020). Tufarelli, Vincenzo (ed.). "Muscle Metabolome Profiles in Woody Breast-(un)Affected Broilers: Effects of Quantum Blue Phytase-Enriched Diet". Frontiers in Veterinary Science. 7: 458. doi:10.3389/fvets.2020.00458. PMC 7417653. PMID 32851035.
- Johnson, Ryan (15 June 2018). "Why does woody breast still have the industry stumped?". Poultry Digital (January 2018 ed.). Global Ag Media.
- Gee, Kelsey (29 March 2016). "Bigger Chickens Bring a Tough New Problem: 'Woody Breast'". Wall Street Journal.
- Wold, Jens Petter; Måge, Ingrid; Løvland, Atle; Wahlstrøm, Karen; RagniOfstad, Sanden (2019). "Near-infrared spectroscopy detects woody breast syndrome in chicken fillets by the markers protein content and degree of water binding". Poultry Science. 98 (1): 480–490. doi:10.3382/ps/pey351. PMID 30165657.
- "Poultry Science Association 107th Annual Meeting Abstracts" (PDF). Poultry Science Association. Archived from the original (PDF) on 12 September 2020.
- Caldas-Cueva, Juan P.; Owens, Casey M. (1 Aug 2020). "A review on the woody breast condition, detection methods, and product utilization in the contemporary poultry industry". Journal of Animal Science. 98 (8). doi:10.1093/jas/skaa207. PMC 7419734. PMID 32783056.
- Sims, Bob (12 May 2022). "Predictability of woody breast in live birds proves challenging". Sosland Publishing.
