= First Broiler House =

- U.S. National Register of Historic Places
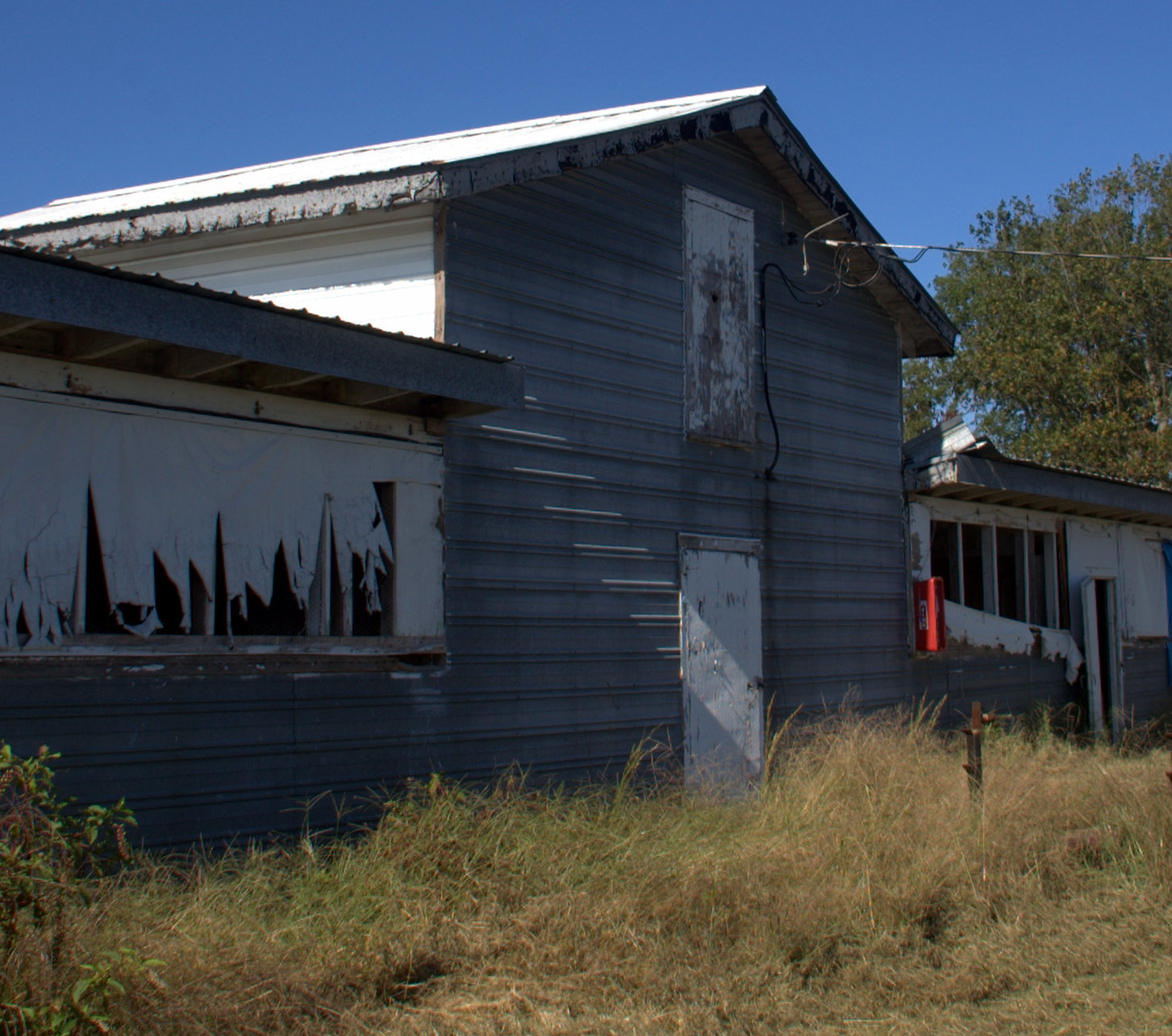

- Location within Delaware Location within the United States
- Interactive map showing the location for the First Broiler House
- Location: University of Delaware Experimental Station, Georgetown, Delaware
- Coordinates: 38°38′9″N 75°27′16″W
- Area: 0 acres (0 ha)
- Built: 1923
- NRHP reference No.: 74000607
- Added to NRHP: July 3, 1974

The First Broiler House, also known as Mrs. Wilmer Steele's Broiler House, is preserved at the University of Delaware Agricultural Experiment Station near Georgetown, Delaware as an example of a chicken house that was widely used to raise broiler chickens in Delaware during the 1920s. An example of an individual-colony house, the 16-foot (4.9 m) square wood-frame building housed 500 chickens. It was provided with a coal stove.

Cecile Steele of Ocean View, Delaware was the first person in Delaware to raise chickens specifically for meat production, separately from her laying flock that was primarily meant to produce eggs. The wife of a Coast Guardsman stationed at the Bethany Beach Lifesaving Station, she raised her first flock of 500 in 1923, selling 387 two-pound chickens for 67 cents per pound. She ordered 50, but was accidentally shipped 500 which she decided to keep and sell at a discount. Her business model was profitable. In 1924 she doubled to 1,000 chickens, and in 1925 leaped to 10,000. By 1973, 50 years later, the industry processed 3 billion chickens per year.

The broiler house has been moved from its original site at the Steele farm and has been repaired. It was listed on the National Register of Historic Places on July 3, 1974.

== See also ==
- Cecile Long Steele
- Broiler
- Broiler industry
