= Cecile Long Steele =

American broiler chicken industry pioneer

- Born: Cecile Ann Long; 1900
- Died: 1940 (aged 39–40)
- Known for: Pioneering the broiler chicken industry in the United States.
- Spouse: David Wilmer Steele junior (m. 1918)
- Children: 4
- Awards: Hall of Fame of Delaware Women (inducted 1983)

Cecile Long Steele (1900–1940) was an American chicken farmer from Ocean View, Delaware, considered to be the pioneer of the broiler chicken industry in the United States. She was the first person in Delaware to raise chickens specifically for meat production, separately from her laying flock that was primarily meant to produce eggs. Steele was inducted into the Hall of Fame of Delaware Women in 1983.

== Career ==
Cecile Steele was the first person in Delaware to raise chickens specifically for meat production, known as broilers. Before the 1920s, chickens were generally raised for egg production on small family farms to be consumed by the family or for sale to bring in additional income; meat was only a by-product of this industry when hens became non-productive or cockerels were slaughtered during the spring. As a result, chicken meat was an expensive rarity.

Steele's role as a pioneer arose because of a shipping error by a Dagsboro hatchery in 1923, which meant that 500 chickens were delivered to her after she had ordered just 50 to replenish her flock. Steele kept and raised the 450 additional chickens, housing them in a small barn heated by a coal oven. Her husband drove upstate via the newly built DuPont Highway to sell the 387 surviving birds (each of which weighed around two pounds) in a city market, getting 62 cents a pound. Many of the birds were also sold in New York City markets where they were slaughtered using kosher techniques for the city's Jewish population (chicken is a traditional Sabbath meal).

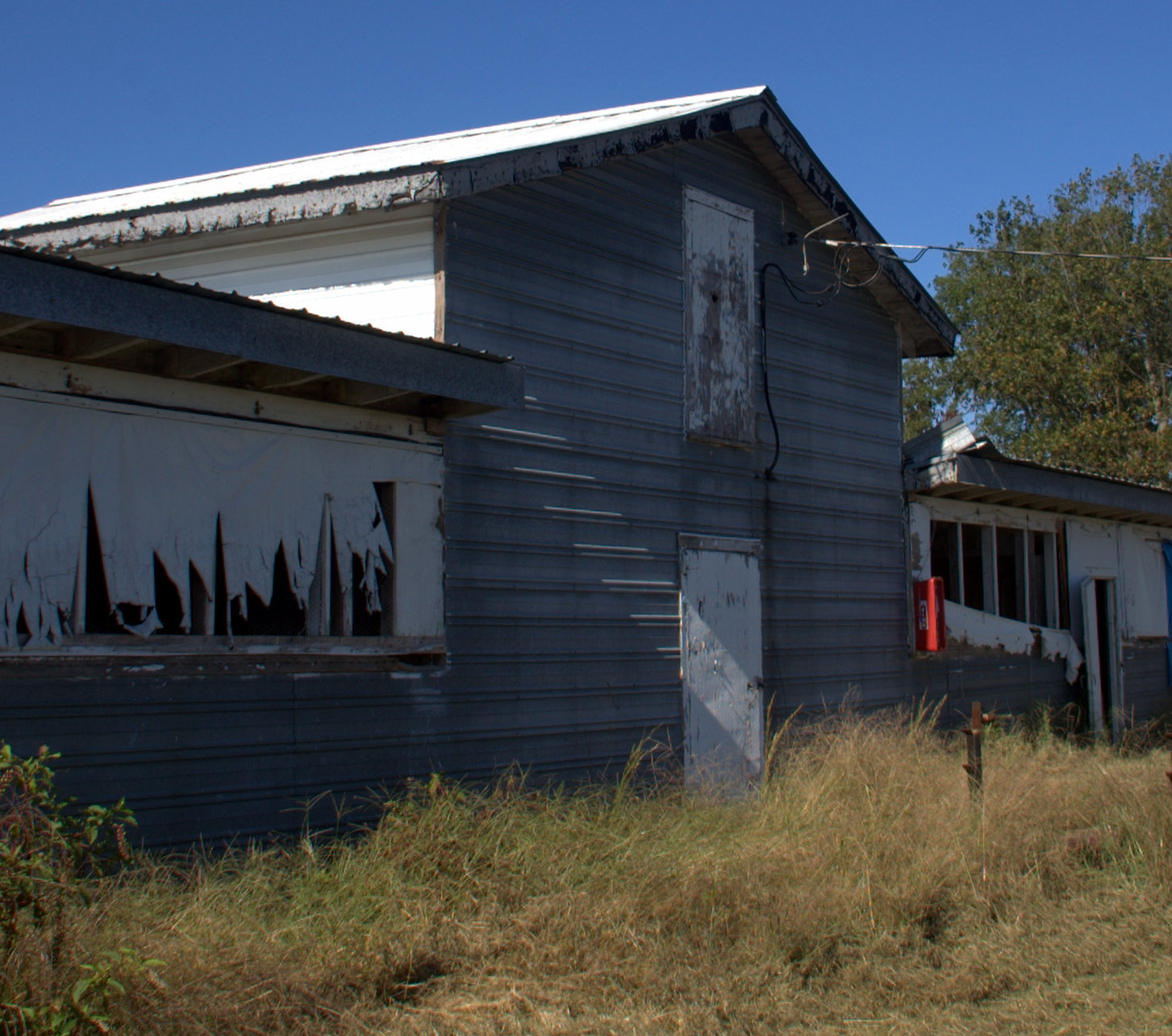
A front view of the First Broiler House, an example of an individual-colony chicken house widely used in Delaware in the 1920s

Using the profits from the initial experiment, Cecile Steele doubled her production to 1000 chickens in 1924. Other farmers in Sussex County began to convert their laying houses to broiler houses after seeing the success enjoyed by the Steeles. By 1935, the Steeles owned seven farms and were raising 35,000 broiler chickens per year.

One of the broiler houses from the Steeles' farm, known as the First Broiler House, is listed on the National Register of Historic Places. Having been relocated to Georgetown and restored, it is now owned by the University of Delaware and is preserved at the Delaware Agricultural Museum.

== Personal life ==
Born Cecile Ann Long to Edward and Manie Long in 1900, Cecile married David Wilmer Steele on Christmas Eve, 1918. Initially working for the United States Coast Guard stationed at Bethany Beach, David Steele quit his job after the farm's commercial success in the 1920s and later became a Republican Delaware State Senator, serving from 1937 until his death.

On October 7, 1940, Steele and her husband died at sea in a boating accident. The couple were entertaining guests on their cruiser, The Lure, when its motor exploded. Cecile died after jumping into the water in an attempt to save her husband, who had been propelled into the water by the explosion. Their deaths were reported on the front page of the Wilmington Morning News.

== See also ==
- Broiler industry
- First Broiler House
- Ocean View, Delaware
