= Cooks Venture =

Former US poultry company

Cooks Venture was a US poultry company founded in 2019 with goals such as using a slower-growing broiler breed and avoiding antibiotics. The company abruptly closed in 2023 after struggling to raise money. Without money left to feed chickens or process them, around 1.3 million chickens were killed via foam depopulation (a mass killing method) with help from the Arkansas Department of Agriculture. The company promised contract farmers to help with the removal of the dead chickens but left the task up to the vast majority of farmers. In 2024, contract farmers filed a lawsuit against four of the company's former executives, claiming the company was turned into a "de facto Ponzi scheme" and misled them.

== Origin ==
The company was founded by Matt Wadiak in 2019 and was based in Decatur, Arkansas. They aimed to diverge from some common practices in the industry. One of the larger goals was around using slower-growing chickens. Modern fast-growing breeds like the Ross 308 and Cobb 500 make up over 90% of all global broilers. They suffer from higher rates of health issues. Cooks Venture created their own hybrid breed of slower-growing chickens called the Pioneer. Without universally agreed definitions, some considered the Pioneer to still be fast-growing—just slower than most mainstream breeds.

They also prominently called themselves "pasture raised". For their interpretation of this, contract farmers used existing chicken houses and cut some doors into the side. For a limited amount of time per day, the doors would be opened. In addition, they claimed a desire to use regenerative farming techniques with the aim of reducing environmental damages. Though such techniques have faced criticism from scientists as doing less than advocates say they do, and some people consider it potentially a form of greenwashing.

Cooks Venture also aimed to avoid ever using antibiotics. Adding a no-antibiotics label legally does not require inspections, only submission of documents to the USDA. To try to add more validation for their claims, they submitted to third-party testing.

== Collapse ==
Some contract farmers say the company pursued rapid market growth beyond anything else. To maintain that growth, they allege the company gave farmers an inflated estimates of future earnings so they would invest their own funding into chicken housing. The company did not reach profitability during its existence, and in the two years before closure, the whole industry started facing rising headwinds. Inflation pushed operating costs higher, and starting October 2022, there was a decrease in chicken prices. Their prices were already around double conventional chicken prices.

In February 2023, Southeast Poultry Inc. sued Cooks Venture for failing to pay for their meat processing from Nov 21 to Dec 27th, 2022. Cooks denied the allegations but settled in May 2023.

In August 2023, then CEO Matt Wadiak left the company for unclear reasons. John Niemann was then named CEO. A few months later the company shut down operations abruptly on November 17th, 2023. Some farmers were still being sent chickens hours before notice of the closure went out. From November 20th to 30th, 511 workers were laid off. Around this time they were still actively looking for a new buyer.

== Aftermath ==
=== 2023 ===
Around a week after shutting down operations, Cooks informed farmers that it lacked the ability to process any chickens and would be killing the ~1.3 million birds. Out of money, they asked the Arkansas Department of Agriculture to carry this out on the grounds of bird flu. However, many farmers claimed their flocks tested negative for it.

In late November, the state of Arkansas said that already around 800 thousand birds had been killed via foam depopulation and was continuing to do so. Contract farmers reported that the company pledged to pay for "services rendered," though they had not received anything. The company pledged to help with the removal of the dead birds, but a number of contract farmers reported them being left there.

On December 7th, a group of 50 contract farmers and various state officials met. At the meeting Arkansas State Senator Bryan King accused Poultry Division Director Patrick Fisk of needlessly killing over a million birds. Fisk argued this was preferable to letting all the birds starve, as he believed Cooks Venture would do without him stepping in. When asked about the ordeal around this time, one representative of Cooks Venture stated "this is a tragedy".

On December 8th, Bryan King sent a letter to governor Sarah Huckabee Sanders asking for her to declare a state of emergency over the animal welfare, environmental, disease, and economic concerns of the killing of all the chickens. The governor denied the request, calling it contrary to the values of free and fair markets. On Twitter, the governor's communication director added that "'Conservatives' shouldn’t ask for government bailouts of private businesses on the backs of Arkansas taxpayers."

A few weeks later, one contract farmer reported that he had run out of feed. He claims the state of Arkansas told him they would kill the birds, but this did not happen. He received small amounts of feed, but not enough to keep most chickens alive, leading to high rates of mortality and cannibalism.

=== 2024 ===
On February 2nd, there was a legislative meeting at the Arkansas state capitol with contract farmers and state officials. State senators argued about how to move forward. Some argued the primary focus should be on Cooks Venture's failures over any with the Arkansas Department of Agriculture. Others argued the state should step in more to address issues.

On February 8th, Bryan King sent another letter to the governor about plans to introduce legislation to compensate contract farmers for losses and calling for the resignation of Agriculture Secretary Wes Ward and Livestock and Patrick Fisk. Such legislation was introduced in late April and unanimously voted down in committee.

On April 19th, the company filed for Chapter 7 bankruptcy. In the filings they noted 90,000 live chickens and between $1-10 million in assets, but between $50-$100 million in liabilities.

On September 25th, 13 former contract farmers filed suit against four former executives of the company. They alleged the company was designed as a "de facto Ponzi scheme" that prioritized rapid growth over any other quality. They also allege that the company did not shut down all operations as they had informed contract growers. They allege that the in-house breeding and all the feeding necessary for it was still ongoing during bankruptcy procedures at the time of the complaint.
