= Intensive animal farming =

Branch of agriculture

Intensive animal farming, industrial livestock production, and macro-farms, also known as factory farming, is a type of intensive agriculture used by the meat and dairy industry to maximize animal production while minimizing costs. To achieve this, agribusinesses keep livestock such as cattle, poultry, and fish at high stocking densities, at large scale, and using modern machinery, biotechnology, and pharmaceutics. The main products are meat, milk and eggs for human consumption.

While intensive animal farming can produce large amounts of animal products at a low cost with reduced human labor, it is controversial as it raises several ethical concerns, including animal exploitation, animal welfare issues (confinement, mutilations, stress-induced aggression, breeding complications), public health risks (zoonotic diseases, pandemic risks, antibiotic resistance), and worker exploitation, particularly of undocumented workers. Both intensive and extensive animal farming require significant land to feed the livestock and cause harm to the environment and wildlife through greenhouse gases, deforestation and eutrophication. The animal agriculture industry has been accused of actively supporting disinformation campaigns and preventing policies to address climate change.

Industrial livestock production is important in most of the large meat-producing regions, such as Brazil, the United States, China, Argentina, Australia, New Zealand and the European Union, with expansion of megafarms or concentrated animal feeding operations.

== History ==
Intensive animal farming is a relatively recent development in the history of agriculture, utilizing scientific discoveries and technological advances to enable changes in agricultural methods that increase production. Innovations from the late 19th century generally parallel developments in mass production in other industries in the latter part of the Industrial Revolution. The discovery of vitamins and their role in animal nutrition, in the first two decades of the 20th century, led to vitamin supplements, which allowed chickens to be raised indoors. The discovery of antibiotics and vaccines facilitated raising livestock in larger numbers by reducing disease. Chemicals developed for use in World War II gave rise to synthetic pesticides. Developments in shipping networks and technology have made long-distance distribution of agricultural produce feasible.

Agricultural production across the world doubled four times between 1820 and 1975 (1820 to 1920; 1920 to 1950; 1950 to 1965; and 1965 to 1975) to feed a global population of one billion human beings in 1800 and 6.5 billion in 2002. During the same period, the number of people involved in farming dropped as the process became more automated. In the 1930s, 24 percent of the American population worked in agriculture compared to 1.5 percent in 2002; in 1940, each farm worker supplied 11 consumers, whereas in 2002, each worker supplied 90 consumers.

The era of factory farming in Britain began in 1947 when a new Agriculture Act granted subsidies to farmers to encourage greater output by introducing new technology, in order to reduce Britain's reliance on imported meat. The United Nations writes that "intensification of animal production was seen as a way of providing food security." In 1966, the United States, United Kingdom and other industrialized nations, commenced factory farming of beef and dairy cattle and domestic pigs. As a result, farming became concentrated on fewer larger farms. For example, in 1967, there were one million pig farms in America; as of 2002, there were 114,000. In 1992, 28% of American pigs were raised on farms selling >5,000 pigs per year; as of 2022 this grew to 94.5%. From its American and West European heartland, intensive animal farming became globalized in the later years of the 20th century and is still expanding and replacing traditional practices of stock rearing in an increasing number of countries. In 1990 intensive animal farming accounted for 30% of world meat production and by 2005, this had risen to 40%.

== Process ==
The aim is to produce large quantities of meat, eggs, or milk at the lowest possible cost. Food is supplied in place. Methods employed to maintain health and improve production may include the use of disinfectants, antimicrobial agents, anthelmintics, hormones and vaccines; protein, mineral and vitamin supplements; frequent health inspections; biosecurity; and climate-controlled facilities. Physical restraints, for example, fences or creeps, are used to control movement or actions regarded as undesirable. Breeding programs are used to produce animals more suited to the confined conditions and able to provide a consistent food product.

Industrial production was estimated to account for 39 percent of the sum of global production of these meats and 50 percent of total egg production. In the US, according to its National Pork Producers Council, 80 million of its 95 million pigs slaughtered each year are reared in industrial settings.

The major concentration of the industry occurs at the slaughter and meat processing phase, with only four companies slaughtering and processing 81 percent of cows, 73 percent of sheep, 57 percent of pigs and 50 percent of chickens. This concentration at the slaughter phase may be in large part due to regulatory barriers that may make it financially difficult for small slaughter plants to be built, maintained or remain in business. Factory farming may be no more beneficial to livestock producers than traditional farming because it appears to contribute to overproduction that drives down prices. Through "forward contracts" and "marketing agreements", meatpackers are able to set the price of livestock long before they are ready for production. These strategies often cause farmers to lose money, as half of all U.S. family farming operations did in 2007.

Many of the nation's livestock producers would like to market livestock directly to consumers but with limited USDA inspected slaughter facilities, livestock grown locally can not typically be slaughtered and processed locally.

Small farmers are often absorbed into factory farm operations, acting as contract growers for the industrial facilities. In the case of poultry contract growers, farmers are required to make costly investments in construction of sheds to house the birds, buy required feed and drugs – often settling for slim profit margins, or even losses.

In the United States, one of the principal kinds of facilities for dense animal agriculture is the concentrated animal feeding operation (CAFO). Research has shown that many immigrant workers in CAFOs receive little to no job-specific training or safety and health information regarding the hazards associated with these jobs. Workers with limited English proficiency are significantly less likely to receive any work-related training, since it is often only provided in English. As a result, many workers do not perceive their jobs as dangerous. This causes inconsistent personal protective equipment (PPE) use, and can lead to workplace accidents and injuries. Immigrant workers are also less likely to report any workplace hazards and injuries.

== Types ==
Intensive farms hold large numbers of animals, typically cows, pigs, turkeys, geese, or chickens, often indoors, typically at high densities.

Intensive production of livestock and poultry is widespread in developed nations. For 2002–2003, the United Nations' Food and Agriculture Organization (FAO) estimates of industrial production as a percentage of global production were 7 percent for beef and veal, 0.8 percent for sheep and goat meat, 42 percent for pork, and 67 percent for poultry meat.

=== Chickens ===
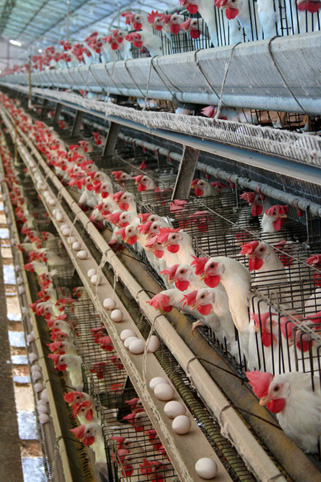
Hens in Brazil

The major milestone in 20th-century poultry production was the discovery of vitamin D, which made it possible to keep chickens in confinement year-round. Before this, chickens did not thrive during the winter (due to lack of sunlight), and egg production, incubation, and meat production in the off-season were all very difficult, making poultry a seasonal and expensive proposition. Year-round production lowered costs, especially for broilers.

At the same time, egg production was increased by scientific breeding. After a few false starts, (such as the Maine Experiment Station's failure at improving egg production) success was shown by Professor Dryden at the Oregon Experiment Station.

Improvements in production and quality were accompanied by lower labor requirements. In the 1930s through the early 1950s, 1,500 hens provided a full-time job for a farm family in America. In the late 1950s, egg prices had fallen so dramatically that farmers typically tripled the number of hens they kept, putting three hens into what had been a single-bird cage or converting their floor-confinement houses from a single deck of roosts to triple-decker roosts. Not long after this, prices fell still further and large numbers of egg farmers left the business. This fall in profitability was accompanied by a general fall in prices to the consumer, allowing poultry and eggs to lose their status as luxury foods.

Robert Plamondon reports that the last family chicken farm in his part of Oregon, Rex Farms, had 30,000 layers and survived into the 1990s. However, the standard laying house of the current operators is around 125,000 hens.

The vertical integration of the egg and poultry industries was a late development, occurring after all the major technological changes had been in place for years (including the development of modern broiler rearing techniques, the adoption of the Cornish Cross broiler, the use of laying cages, etc.).

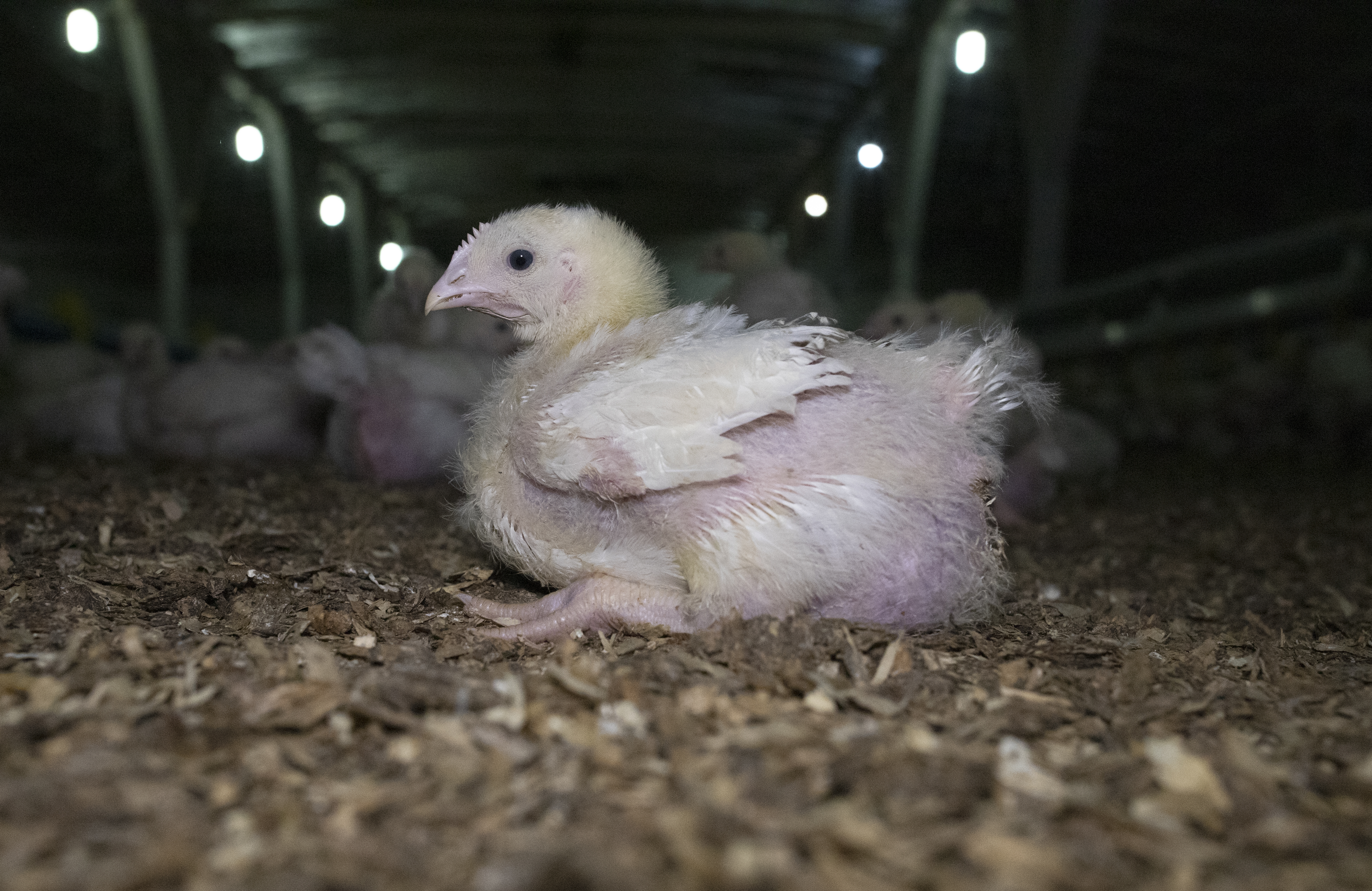
Broiler chickens, bred for meat production, regularly have health issues, as their genetics have been optimized for quick growth, sometimes causing broiler ascites syndrome.

By the late 1950s, poultry production had changed dramatically. Large farms and packing plants could grow birds by the tens of thousands. Chickens could be sent to slaughterhouses for butchering and processing into prepackaged commercial products to be frozen or shipped fresh to markets or wholesalers. Meat-type chickens currently grow to market weight in six to seven weeks, whereas only fifty years ago it took three times as long. This is due to genetic selection and nutritional modifications (but not the use of growth hormones, which are illegal for use in poultry in the US and many other countries, and have no effect). Once a meat consumed only occasionally, the common availability and lower cost has made chicken a common meat product within developed nations. Growing concerns over the cholesterol content of red meat in the 1980s and 1990s further resulted in increased consumption of chicken.

Today, eggs are produced on large egg ranches on which environmental parameters are well controlled. Chickens are exposed to artificial light cycles to stimulate egg production year-round. In addition, forced molting is commonly practiced in the US, in which manipulation of light and food access triggers molting, in order to increase egg size and production. Forced molting is controversial, and is prohibited in the EU.

On average, a chicken lays one egg a day, but not on every day of the year. This varies with the breed and time of year. In 1900, average egg production was 83 eggs per hen per year. In 2000, it was well over 300. In the United States, laying hens are butchered after their second egg laying season. In Europe, they are generally butchered after a single season. The laying period begins when the hen is about 18–20 weeks old (depending on breed and season). Males of the egg-type breeds have little commercial value at any age, and all those not used for breeding (roughly fifty percent of all egg-type chickens) are killed soon after hatching. The old hens also have little commercial value. Thus, the main sources of poultry meat 100 years ago (spring chickens and stewing hens) have both been entirely supplanted by meat-type broiler chickens.

=== Pigs ===
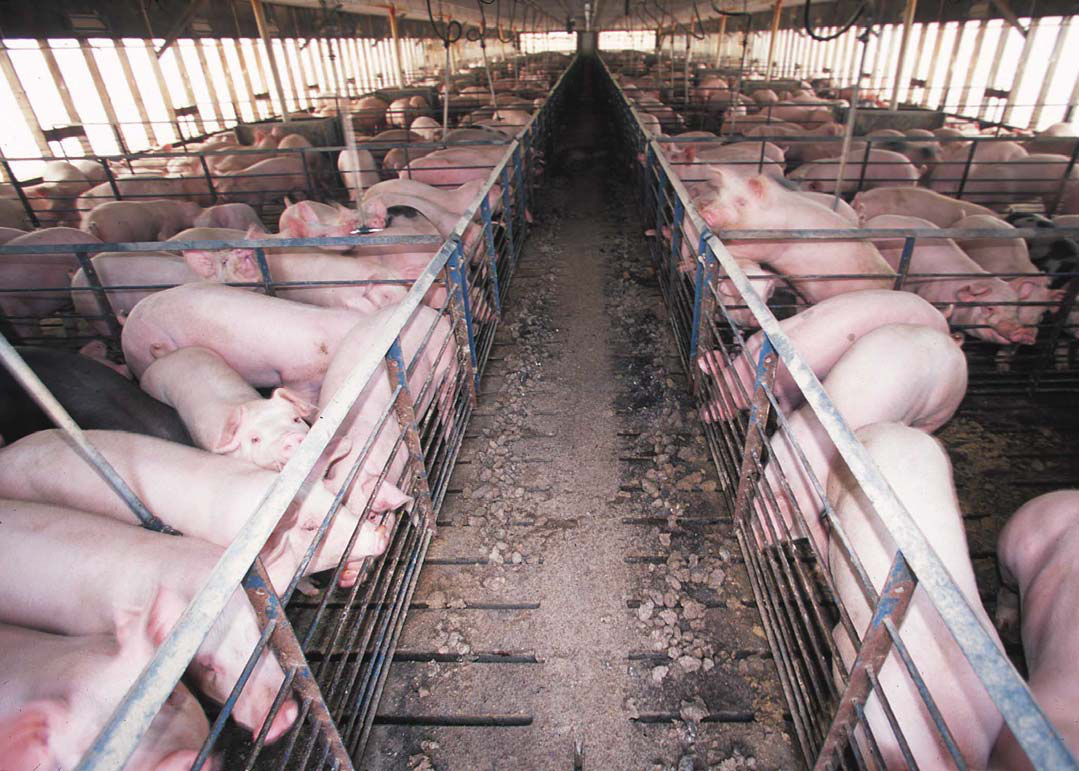
Pigs confined to a barn in an intensive system, Midwestern United States

Intensive piggeries (or hog lots) are a type of concentrated animal feeding operation (CAFO), specialized for the raising of domestic pigs up to slaughter weight. In this system, grower pigs are housed indoors in group-housing or straw-lined sheds, whilst pregnant sows are confined in sow stalls (gestation crates) and give birth in farrowing crates.

The use of sow stalls has resulted in lower production costs and concomitant animal welfare concerns. Many of the world's largest producers of pigs (such as U.S. and Canada) use sow stalls, but some nations (such as the UK) and U.S. states (such as Florida and Arizona) have banned them.

Intensive piggeries are generally large warehouse-like buildings. Indoor pig systems allow the pig's condition to be monitored, ensuring minimum fatalities and increased productivity. Buildings are ventilated and their temperature regulated. Most domestic pig varieties are susceptible to heat stress, and all pigs lack sweat glands and cannot cool themselves. Pigs have a limited tolerance to high temperatures and heat stress can lead to death. Maintaining a more specific temperature within the pig-tolerance range also maximizes growth and growth to feed ratio. In an intensive operation pigs will lack access to a wallow (mud), which is their natural cooling mechanism. Intensive piggeries control temperature through ventilation or drip water systems (dropping water to cool the system).

Pigs are naturally omnivorous and are generally fed a combination of grains and protein sources (soybeans, or meat and bone meal). Larger intensive pig farms may be surrounded by farmland where feed-grain crops are grown. Alternatively, piggeries are reliant on the grains industry. Pig feed may be bought packaged or mixed on-site. The intensive piggery system, where pigs are confined in individual stalls, allows each pig to be allotted a portion of feed. The individual feeding system also facilitates individual medication of pigs through feed. This has more significance to intensive farming methods, as the close proximity to other animals enables diseases to spread more rapidly. To prevent disease spreading and encourage growth, drug programs such as antibiotics, vitamins, hormones and other supplements are pre-emptively administered.

Indoor systems, especially stalls and pens (i.e. 'dry', not straw-lined systems) allow for the easy collection of waste. In an indoor intensive pig farm, manure can be managed through a lagoon system or other waste-management system. However, odor remains a problem which is difficult to manage.

Piglets often receive range of treatments including castration, tail docking to reduce tail biting, teeth clipped (to reduce injuring their mother's nipples, gum disease and prevent later tusk growth) and their ears notched to assist identification. Treatments are usually made without painkillers. Weak runts may be slain shortly after birth.

Piglets also may be weaned and removed from the sows at between two and five weeks old and placed in sheds. However, grower pigs – which comprise the bulk of the herd – are usually housed in alternative indoor housing, such as batch pens. During pregnancy, the use of a stall may be preferred as it facilitates feed-management and growth control. It also prevents pig aggression (e.g. tail biting, ear biting, vulva biting, food stealing). Group pens generally require higher stockmanship skills. Such pens will usually not contain straw or other material. Alternatively, a straw-lined shed may house a larger group (i.e. not batched) in age groups.

=== Cattle ===
Cattle are domesticated ungulates, a member of the family Bovidae, in the subfamily Bovinae, and descended from the aurochs (Bos primigenius). They are raised as livestock for their flesh (called beef and veal), dairy products (milk), leather and as draught animals. As of 2009–2010 it is estimated that there are 1.3–1.4 billion head of cattle in the world.

Diagram of feedlot system. This can be contrasted with more traditional grazing systems.

The beef industry is segmented with the bulk of the producers participating in raising beef calves. Beef calves are generally raised in small herds, with over 90% of the herds having less than 100 head of cattle. Fewer producers participate in the finishing phase which often occurs in a feedlot. As of 2022, in the US, there are 732,123 cattle farms, including 622,162 for beef and 11,186 specializing in feedlots.

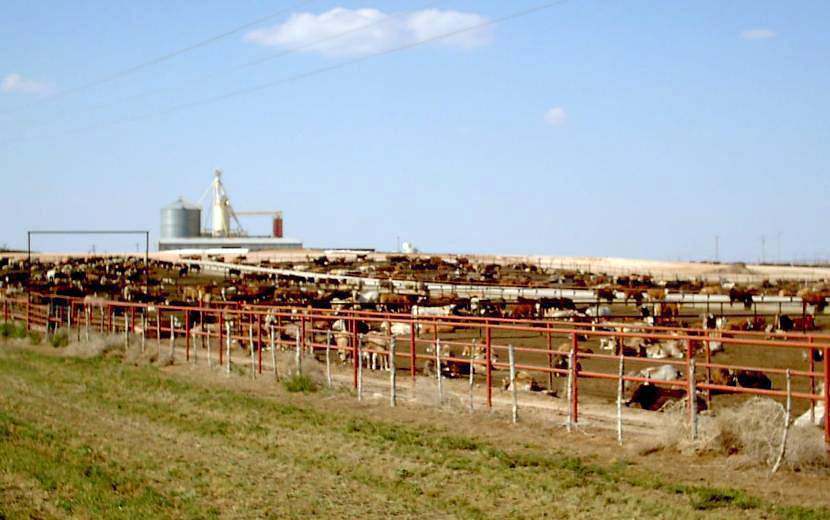
Beef cattle on a feedlot in the Texas Panhandle. Such confinement creates more work for the farmer but allows the animals to grow rapidly.

Young cattle may begin by grazing with their mothers. Once cattle obtain an entry-level weight, about 650 pounds (290 kg), they are transferred from the range to a feedlot to be fed a specialized animal feed which can include corn byproducts, barley, soy and other grains as well as alfalfa and cottonseed meal. Typical industrial production mixes will include premixes composed of microingredients such as vitamins, minerals, chemical preservatives, antibiotics, fermentation products, and other essential ingredients that are purchased from premix companies, usually in sacked form, for blending into commercial rations.

There are many potential impacts on human health from intensive cattle farming. Prophylactic antibiotics can be a source of antibiotic resistance. The intensive feeding systems lead to more E. coli contamination, and increased saturated fat in the meat due to grain-based diets. The environmental impacts also pose indirect health risks.

=== Aquaculture ===
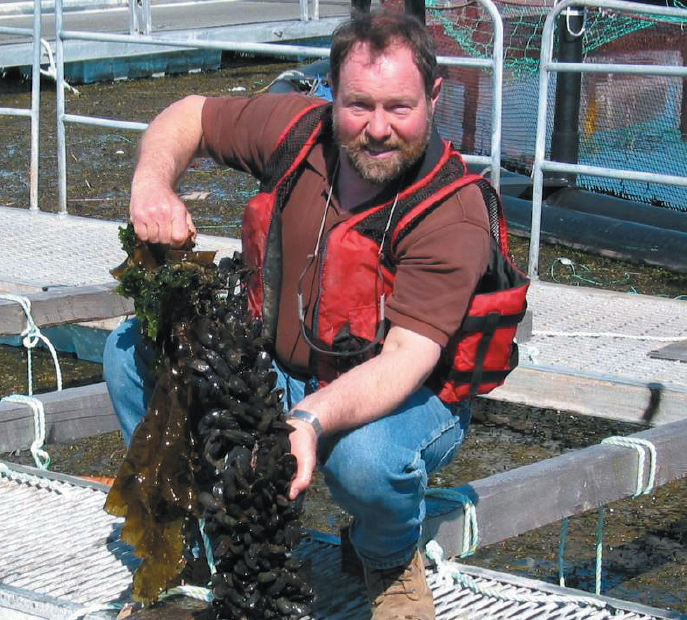
Blue mussels cultivated in proximity to Atlantic salmon in the Bay of Fundy, Canada

Integrated multi-trophic aquaculture (IMTA), also called integrated aquaculture, is a practice in which the by-products (wastes) from one species are recycled to become inputs (fertilizers, food) for another, making aquaculture intensive. Fed aquaculture (e.g. fish and shrimp) is combined with inorganic extractive (e.g. seaweed) and organic extractive (e.g. shellfish) aquaculture to create balanced systems for environmental sustainability (biomitigation), economic stability (product diversification and risk reduction) and social acceptability (better management practices).

The system is multi-trophic as it makes use of species from different trophic or nutritional level, unlike traditional aquaculture.

Ideally, the biological and chemical processes in such a system should balance. This is achieved through the appropriate selection and proportions of different species providing different ecosystem functions. The co-cultured species should not just be biofilters, but harvestable crops of commercial value. A working IMTA system should result in greater production for the overall system, based on mutual benefits to the co-cultured species and improved ecosystem health, even if the individual production of some of the species is lower compared to what could be reached in monoculture practices over a short-term period.

== Regulation ==
In various jurisdictions, intensive animal production of some kinds is subject to regulation for environmental protection. In the United States, a Concentrated Animal Feeding Operation (CAFO) that discharges or proposes to discharge waste requires a permit and implementation of a plan for management of manure nutrients, contaminants, wastewater, etc., as applicable, to meet requirements pursuant to the federal Clean Water Act. Some data on regulatory compliance and enforcement are available. In 2000, the US Environmental Protection Agency published 5-year and 1-year data on environmental performance of 32 industries, with data for the livestock industry being derived mostly from inspections of CAFOs. The data pertain to inspections and enforcement mostly under the Clean Water Act, but also under the Clean Air Act and Resource Conservation and Recovery Act. Of the 32 industries, livestock production was among the top seven for environmental performance over the 5-year period, and was one of the top two in the final year of that period, where good environmental performance is indicated by a low ratio of enforcement orders to inspections. The five-year and final-year ratios of enforcement/inspections for the livestock industry were 0.05 and 0.01, respectively. Also in the final year, the livestock industry was one of the two leaders among the 32 industries in terms of having the lowest percentage of facilities with violations. In Canada, intensive livestock operations are subject to provincial regulation, with definitions of regulated entities varying among provinces. Examples include Intensive Livestock Operations (Saskatchewan), Confined Feeding Operations (Alberta), Feedlots (British Columbia), High-density Permanent Outdoor Confinement Areas (Ontario) and Feedlots or Parcs d'Engraissement (Manitoba). In Canada, intensive animal production, like other agricultural sectors, is also subject to various other federal and provincial requirements.

In the United States, farmed animals are excluded by half of all state animal cruelty laws including the federal Animal Welfare Act. The 28-hour law, enacted in 1873 and amended in 1994 states that when animals are being transported for slaughter, the vehicle must stop every 28 hours and the animals must be let out for exercise, food, and water. The United States Department of Agriculture claims that the law does not apply to birds. The Humane Slaughter Act is similarly limited. Originally passed in 1958, the Act requires that livestock be stunned into unconsciousness prior to slaughter. This Act also excludes birds, who make up more than 90 percent of the animals slaughtered for food, as well as rabbits and fish. Individual states all have their own animal cruelty statutes; however many states have right-to-farm laws that serve as a provision to exempt standard agricultural practices.

In the United States there is an attempt to regulate farms in the most realistic way possible. The easiest way to effectively regulate the most animals with a limited number of resources and time is to regulate the large farms. In New York State many Animal Feeding Operations are not considered CAFOs since they have less than 300 cows. These farms are not regulated to the level that CAFOs are, which may lead to unchecked pollution and nutrient leaching. The EPA website illustrates the scale of this problem by saying in New York State's Bay watershed there are 247 animal feeding operations and only 68 of them are State Pollutant Discharge Elimination System (SPDES) permitted CAFOs.

In Ohio animal welfare organizations reached a negotiated settlement with farm organizations while in California, Proposition 2, Standards for Confining Farm Animals, an initiated law was approved by voters in 2008. Regulations have been enacted in other states and plans are underway for referendum and lobbying campaigns in other states.

An action plan was proposed by the USDA in February 2009, called the Utilization of Manure and Other Agricultural and Industrial Byproducts. This program's goal is to protect the environment and human and animal health by using manure in a safe and effective manner. In order for this to happen, several actions need to be taken and these four components include:

- Improving the Usability of Manure Nutrients through More Effective Animal Nutrition and Management
- Maximizing the Value of Manure through Improved Collection, Storage, and Treatment Options
- Utilizing Manure in Integrated Farming Systems to Improve Profitability and Protect Soil, Water, and Air Quality
- Using Manure and Other Agricultural Byproducts as a Renewable Energy Source

In 2012 Australia's largest supermarket chain, Coles, announced that as of January 1, 2013, they will stop selling company branded pork and eggs from animals kept in factory farms. The nation's other dominant supermarket chain, Woolworths, has already begun phasing out factory farmed animal products. All of Woolworth's house brand eggs are now cage-free, and by mid-2013 all of their pork will come from farmers who operate stall-free farms.

In June 2021, the European Commission announced the plan of a ban on cages for a number of animals, including egg-laying hens, female breeding pigs, calves raised for veal, rabbits, ducks, and geese, by 2027.

== Political influence and lobbying ==
In 2026, the UK government proposed amendments to the National Planning Policy Framework aimed at facilitating the development of large-scale intensive livestock facilities. According to The Guardian, the proposed changes followed lobbying efforts by the British Poultry Council. Groups warned that the reforms could have negative impacts on water quality, air pollution, and rural communities.

== Animal welfare ==
In the UK, the Farm Animal Welfare Council was set up by the government to act as an independent advisor on animal welfare in 1979 and expresses its policy as five freedoms: from hunger and thirst; from discomfort; from pain, injury or disease; to express normal behavior; from fear and distress.

There are differences around the world as to which practices are accepted and there continue to be changes in regulations with animal welfare being a strong driver for increased regulation. For example, the EU is bringing in further regulation to set maximum stocking densities for meat chickens by 2010, where the UK Animal Welfare Minister commented, "The welfare of meat chickens is a major concern to people throughout the European Union. This agreement sends a strong message to the rest of the world that we care about animal welfare."

Factory farming is greatly debated throughout Australia, with many people disagreeing with the methods and ways in which the animals in factory farms are treated. Animals are often under stress from being kept in confined spaces and will attack each other. In an effort to prevent injury leading to infection, their beaks, tails and teeth are removed. Many piglets will die of shock after having their teeth and tails removed, because painkilling medicines are not used in these operations. Factory farms are a popular way to gain space, with animals such as chickens being kept in spaces smaller than an A4 page.

Large scale chicken production regularly puts animals through high intensity, assembly line type processes – such as this chick processing line.

For example, in the UK, debeaking of chickens is deprecated, but it is recognized that it is a method of last resort, seen as better than allowing vicious fighting and ultimately cannibalism. Between 60 and 70 percent of six million breeding sows in the U.S. are confined during pregnancy, and for most of their adult lives, in 2 by 7 ft (0.61 by 2.13 m) gestation crates. According to pork producers and many veterinarians, sows will fight if housed in pens. The largest pork producer in the U.S. said in January 2007 that it will phase out gestation crates by 2017. They are being phased out in the European Union, with a ban effective in 2013 after the fourth week of pregnancy. With the evolution of factory farming, there has been a growing awareness of the issues amongst the wider public, not least due to the efforts of animal rights and welfare campaigners. As a result, gestation crates, one of the more contentious practices, are the subject of laws in the U.S., Europe and around the world to phase out their use as a result of pressure to adopt less confined practices.

Death rates for sows have been increasing in the US from prolapse, which has been attributed to intensive breeding practices. Sows produce on average 23 piglets a year.

According to the 2025 Business Benchmark on Farm Animal Welfare, 135 out of 149 (nearly 90%) of the world's largest food companies received the lowest farm-animal-welfare impact ratings (E or F), indicating little or no evidence that welfare commitments are being implemented.

In the United States alone, over 20 million chickens, 330,000 pigs and 166,000 cattle die during transport to slaughterhouses annually, and some 800,000 pigs are incapable of walking upon arrival. This is often due to being exposed to extreme temperatures and trauma.

=== Demonstrations ===
From 2011 to 2014 each year between 15,000 and 30,000 people gathered under the theme We are fed up! in Berlin to protest against industrial livestock production.

Many global organizations have demonstrated against factory farming all over the world, driven by environmental, ethical, health concerns of the animals. These demonstrations are targeted towards agricultural practices in the industry, financing, and major meat producers. Some key demonstrations and movements over the years have been "Animal Rights Day" in cities like Milan and Mexico city, Global Day of Action to Stop World Bank Factory Farm Finance, and legal challenges against factory farms in the Global South.

== Human health impact ==
According to the U.S. Centers for Disease Control and Prevention (CDC), farms on which animals are intensively reared can cause adverse health reactions in farm workers. Workers may develop acute and chronic lung disease, musculoskeletal injuries, and may catch infections that transmit from animals to human beings (such as tuberculosis). Communities living near these farms are at risk of respiratory illnesses, methicillin-resistant Staphylococcus aureus (MRSA), Q fever, and stress impacts.

=== Contaminants ===
The CDC writes that chemical, bacterial, and viral compounds from animal waste may travel in the soil and water. Residents near such farms report problems such as unpleasant smell, flies and adverse health effects. The CDC has identified a number of pollutants associated with the discharge of animal waste into rivers and lakes, and into the air. Antibiotic use in livestock may create antibiotic-resistant pathogens; parasites, bacteria, and viruses may be spread; ammonia, nitrogen, and phosphorus can reduce oxygen in surface waters and contaminate drinking water; pesticides and hormones may cause hormone-related changes in fish; animal feed and feathers may stunt the growth of desirable plants in surface waters and provide nutrients to disease-causing micro-organisms; trace elements such as arsenic and copper, which are harmful to human health, may contaminate surface waters.

Pesticides are used to control organisms which are considered harmful and they save farmers money by preventing product losses to pests. In the US, about a quarter of pesticides used are used in houses, yards, parks, golf courses, and swimming pools and about 70% are used in agriculture. However, pesticides can make their way into consumers' bodies which can cause health problems. One source of this is bioaccumulation in animals raised on factory farms.

In the European Union, growth hormones are banned on the basis that there is no way of determining a safe level. The UK has stated that in the event of the EU raising the ban at some future date, to comply with a precautionary approach, it would only consider the introduction of specific hormones, proven on a case-by-case basis. In 1998, the EU banned feeding animals antibiotics that were found to be valuable for human health. Furthermore, in 2006 the EU banned all drugs for livestock that were used for growth promotion purposes. As a result of these bans, the levels of antibiotic resistance in animal products and within the human population showed a decrease.

In the United States, the use of antibiotics in livestock is still prevalent. The FDA reports that 80 percent of all antibiotics sold in 2009 were administered to livestock animals, and that many of these antibiotics are identical or closely related to drugs used for treating illnesses in humans. Consequently, many of these drugs are losing their effectiveness on humans, and the total healthcare costs associated with drug-resistant bacterial infections in the United States are between $16.6 billion and $26 billion annually.

=== Disease ===
Zoonotic diseases such as coronavirus disease 2019 (COVID-19), which caused the COVID-19 pandemic, are increasingly linked to environmental changes associated with intensive animal farming. The disruption of pristine forests driven by logging, mining, road building through remote places, rapid urbanisation and population growth is bringing people into closer contact with animal species they may never have been near before. According to Kate Jones, chair of ecology and biodiversity at University College London, the resulting transmission of disease from wildlife to humans is now "a hidden cost of human economic development". The international trade in animal products increases the risk of global transmission of virulent diseases such as swine fever, BSE, foot and mouth and bird flu.

Intensive farming may make the evolution and spread of harmful diseases easier. Many communicable animal diseases spread rapidly through densely spaced populations of animals and crowding makes genetic reassortment more likely. However, small family farms are more likely to introduce bird diseases and more frequent association with people into the mix, as happened in the 2009 flu pandemic.

Methicillin-resistant Staphylococcus aureus (MRSA) has been identified in pigs and humans raising concerns about the role of pigs as reservoirs of MRSA for human infection. One study found that 20% of pig farmers in the United States and Canada in 2007 harbored MRSA. A second study revealed that 81% of Dutch pig farms had pigs with MRSA and 39% of animals at slaughter carried the bug were all of the infections were resistant to tetracycline and many were resistant to other antimicrobials. A more recent study found that MRSA ST398 isolates were less susceptible to tiamulin, an antimicrobial used in agriculture, than other MRSA or methicillin susceptible S. aureus. Cases of MRSA have increased in livestock animals. CC398 is a new clone of MRSA that has emerged in animals and is found in intensively reared production animals (primarily pigs, but also cattle and poultry), where it can be transmitted to humans. Although dangerous to humans, CC398 is often asymptomatic in food-producing animals.

A 2011 nationwide study reported nearly half of the meat and poultry sold in U.S. grocery stores – 47 percent – was contaminated with S. aureus, and more than half of those bacteria – 52 percent – were resistant to at least three classes of antibiotics. Although Staph should be killed with proper cooking, it may still pose a risk to consumers through improper food handling and cross-contamination in the kitchen. The senior author of the study said, "The fact that drug-resistant S. aureus was so prevalent, and likely came from the food animals themselves, is troubling, and demands attention to how antibiotics are used in food-animal production today."

In April 2009, lawmakers in the Mexican state of Veracruz accused large-scale hog and poultry operations of being breeding grounds of a pandemic swine flu, although they did not present scientific evidence to support their claim. A swine flu which have quickly killed more than 100 infected persons in that area, appears to have begun in the vicinity of a Smithfield subsidiary pig CAFO (concentrated animal feeding operation).

== Environmental impact ==
The production of meat and other animal products is a major driver of global environmental degradation, global warming, and biodiversity loss compared to plant-based foods. However, compared to extensive animal farming, factory farming necessitates less land and emits less greenhouse gas for the same amount of product.

Generally, the environmental impacts of factory farming include:

- Deforestation for animal feed production
- Unsustainable pressure on land for production of high-protein/high-energy animal feed
- Pesticide, herbicide, and fertilizer manufacture and use for feed production
- Unsustainable use of water for feed-crops, including groundwater extraction
- Pollution of soil, water and air by nitrogen and phosphorus from fertiliser used for feed-crops and from manure
- Loss of biodiversity due to eutrophication, acidification, pesticides and herbicides
- Worldwide reduction of genetic diversity of livestock and loss of traditional breeds
- Species extinctions due to livestock-related habitat destruction (especially feed-cropping)

Most analyses show that intensively farmed chicken has the lowest overall environmental impact, whereas grass-fed beef has the highest. Animal rights activists point out that because factory farming is more efficient, it reduces the price of meat, which increases demand.

Intensive animal farming produces a large amount of waste, which pollutes the air, soil and water. On intensive pig farms, the animals are generally kept on concrete with slats or grates for the manure to drain through. The manure is usually stored in slurry form (slurry is a liquid mixture of urine and feces). During storage on the farm, slurry emits methane and when manure is spread on fields it emits nitrous oxide and causes nitrogen pollution of land and water. Large quantities and concentrations of waste are produced. Air quality and groundwater are at risk when animal waste is improperly recycled.

== See also ==
- Animal rights
- Animal rights movement
- Animal welfare
- Battery cage
- Cattle Health Initiative
- Cattle ranching
- Cobb 500
- Commodity status of animals
- Controlled-atmosphere killing
- Cultured meat
- Dominion (2018 film)
- Environmental vegetarianism
- Environmental issues with soy
- Farm Sanctuary
- Factory farming divestment
- Food systems
- Fodder
- Gestation crate
- Golden Triangle of Meat-packing
- Humane Slaughter Act
- List of foodborne illness outbreaks
- List of United States foodborne illness outbreaks
- Meat Atlas
- Mercy for Animals
- Organic farming
- Ross 308
- Slash-and-burn
- Small-scale agriculture
- Veganism
