= Hock burns =

Leg injuries commonly found in birds raised for meat

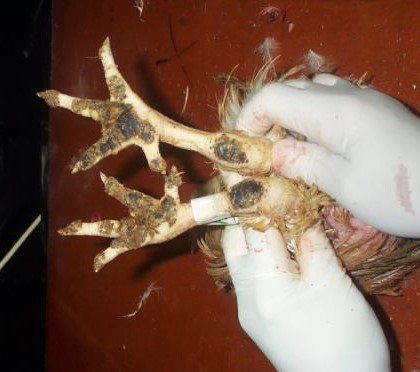
Foot pad dermatitis and hock burns on a broiler chicken, 2011

Hock burns are lesions found on the hock joints of chickens and other birds raised on broiler farms. They are considered a form of contact dermatitis. These marks occur when the ammonia from the waste of other birds burns through the skin of the leg, leaving a brown ulcer mark. The condition has been found to be a source of pain for birds, can cause mobility issues, and may increase the risk of bacterial diseases. In severe cases, hock burns can cause visible scabs to form.

Higher rates of hock burns are often used by observers as an indicator of what they see as worse animal welfare conditions. This is in part due to how they occur more often in overcrowded conditions and in birds genetically modified to grow fast. Although the meat is still safe to eat, many processors now remove these marks as they discourage customers.

== Prevalence ==
Hock burns have been identified in birds in Northern Ireland since at least 1978. It appears to have been first described in the scientific literature in a brief account in 1983. From 1984 to 1987, hock burns were identified in 21% of birds. In the decades since its first identification, it has stayed at an overall increased level.

The industry standard target is to have no more than 15% of a flock showing hock burns, but independent studies have found that incidents are more common. In 2024, self-reported data suggests a prevalence of around one-third of farmed birds in the United Kingdom. Spot checks of stores by volunteers found higher rates of 74% for one store's supplier. Researchers in 2005 doing store spot checks found similar rates of around 80% across the United Kingdom. The same researchers also discovered a potential methodological difference between spot check figures and other reported values. After talking with veterinary inspectors, they were told that some slaughterhouses only record large hock burns and do not pay attention to anything smaller.

Hock burns are not limited to the United Kingdom. For instance, in Brazil, hock burns are one of the most frequent causes of carcass condemnation (inspector rejection of meat). In Germany, one study found that over a third of conventional broilers had hock burns.

Various animal rights and animal welfare groups have criticized the prevalence of hock burns. For instance, one poultry specialist at the RSPCA has called it concerning and "sadly too common" in intensive animal farming. Other groups, such as Open Cages, have called it a sign of larger issues within the industry.

== Contributing factors ==
A number of factors are known to contribute to higher rates of hock burns. These include using fast-growing birds, higher stocking densities, and high moisture levels in the litter where birds live. Additionally, it has been found to be more common in male birds and more common in heavier birds. Research suggests that many of the same factors also contribute to foot pad dermatitis, another similar condition. Hock burn and foot pad dermatitis are often found together in the same birds.

== Classification ==
While there is not a fully universal way to classify the severity of hock burn, several methods exist. The most common relies on visual data and is called the Welfare Quality Assessment Protocol. This method puts cases on a five-point scale from zero to four, with zero being no evidence of hock burns and four showing the most severe lesions. Another alternative method works similarly, but rates cases on a three-point scale.

== See also ==
- Battery cage
- Broiler
- Factory farming
- White striping
