= Center for PostNatural History =

Science museum in Pittsburgh, Pennsylvania

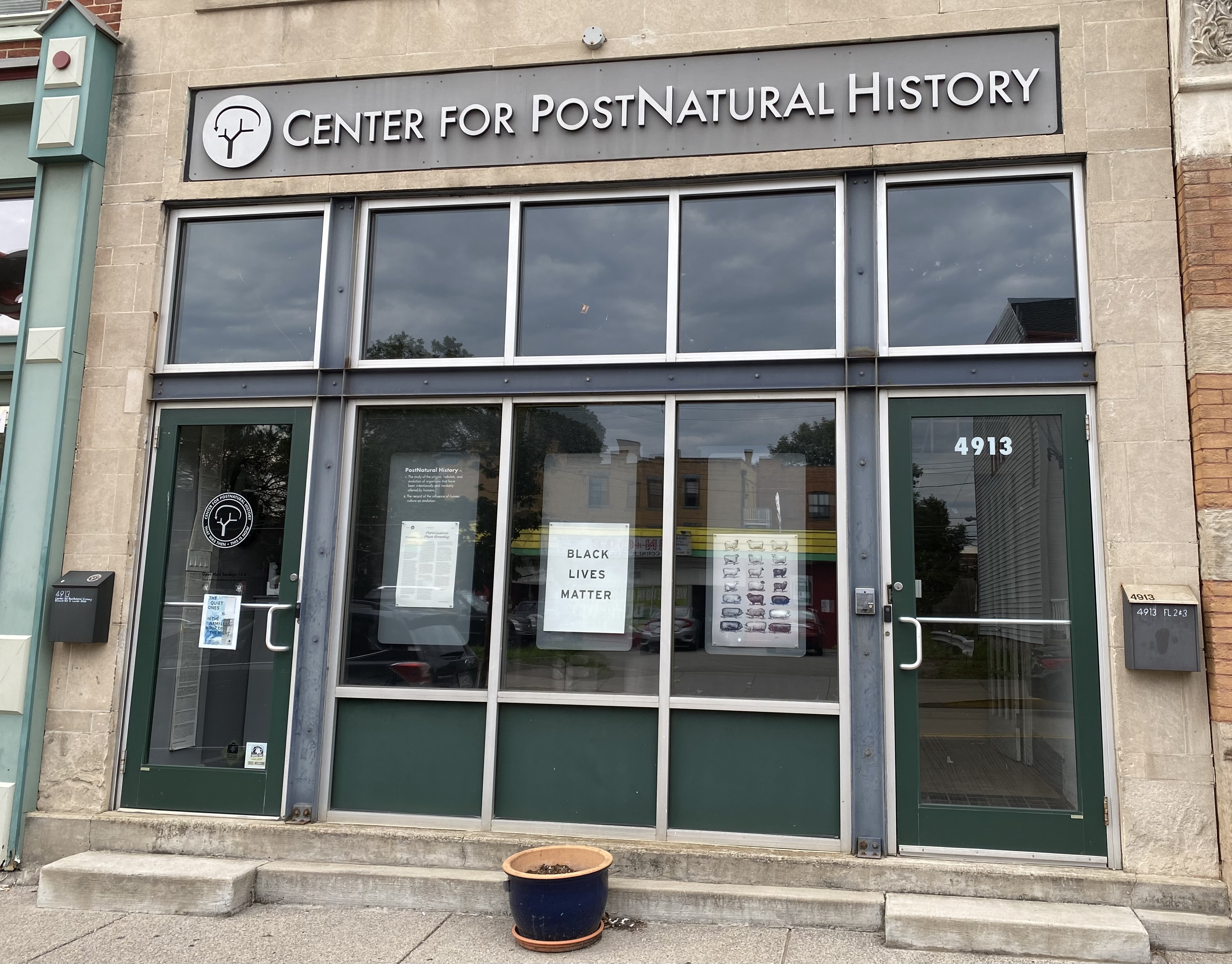
- Front of the Museum in 2022
- Location: 4913 Penn Avenue; Pittsburgh, Pennsylvania 15224
- Coordinates: 40.465357°N 79.944669°W
- Founder: Richard Pell
- Parking: On street
- Website: postnatural.org

The Center for PostNatural History is a storefront museum in Pittsburgh's Garfield neighborhood. In contrast to typical natural history museums, it is focused on the collection and exposition of organisms that have been intentionally and heritably altered by humans by means including selective breeding or genetic engineering, a phenomenon referred to as the postnatural. The Center is "dedicated to the advancement of knowledge relating to the complex interplay between culture, nature, and biotechnology", whose mission is "to acquire, interpret, and provide access to a collection of living, preserved, and documented organisms of postnatural origin".

== Origins ==
It was founded by Richard Pell, an associate professor of Electronic and Time-based Arts at Carnegie Mellon University.

== Exhibits ==
Displays have included GloFish (with fluorescence genes from sea coral), 'Biosteel' goats that grow spider silk proteins in their milk, transgenic fruit flies and a Silkie chicken, bred through the continuation of a recessive gene for its fluffy, fur-like coat.

Exhibits are narrated via wired telephone handset. A range of formats are used including photography, taxidermy and dioramas, and living exhibits. In addition, the Center has an extensive online archive detailing past and current exhibitions, specimens, archives, events and press releases. Details of past exhibitions include notably those of the Cold Coast Archive, a collection of artefacts and seeds from the Svalbard Global Seed Vault collected by researchers and artists Signe Lidén, Annesofie Norn, and Steve Rowell which was displayed at the Center in 2012; Atomic Age Rodents, an archive of rodents from the Smithsonian National Museum of Natural History which had been used in some form or another in atomic testing in the early to mid-20th Century; and PostNatural Nature, produced in collaboration with the Museum für Naturkunde in Berlin documenting different instances of the postnatural in everyday organisms.

Traveling exhibitions for museums and galleries are also produced. Locations displayed at include the Waag Society in Amsterdam and the Art Laboratory in Berlin.

== Design ==
The Center employs a delicate and purposeful aesthetic to the display of their exhibits. It also intentionally uses neutral language so as to invite visitors to go beyond a reactionary impulse to stigma-blighted words, and instead consider the specimens and ideas on a deeper level. "The Center for Post Natural history does not offer a celebration of this technological harnessing of the immanence of life, nor is it a simple rejection. Instead it is a careful exploration of how lives might be lived together, asking what might be at stake for subjects, places, practices and politics".

In addition, the Center also produces a range of other paraphernalia pertaining to their collections and other conceptions of the postnatural. These include books, T-shirts and postcards, and 3D archival prints which can be purchased on site.

== Recent news ==
In 2015, the Center was featured by National Geographic in their March 2015 The Age of Disbelief issue.
