= DuPont Highway =

The DuPont Highway is a north–south road running the length of the U.S. state of Delaware from Selbyville to Wilmington. The highway, which was finished in 1923, became part of the U.S. Highway System in 1926 and was composed of:

- U.S. Route 113 between Selbyville and Dover (the portion between Milford and Dover is now Delaware Route 1)
- U.S. Route 13 between Dover and Wilmington (the DuPont Highway name now continues along US 13 south of Dover to the border between Kent and Sussex counties)
