= Chicken of Tomorrow contest =

Animal husbandry contest

The Chicken of Tomorrow contest was an animal husbandry contest held between 1946 and 1948 and sponsored by the American grocery store chain A&P, in partnership with the US Department of Agriculture (USDA), to encourage the development of broiler chickens breeds with more meat. Most broiler chickens around the world descend from the contest such as the Cobb 500.

== History ==
In 1945, A&P was convicted by the U.S. Justice Department for criminal restraint of trade. To improve its image during and after the trial, A&P decided to start the contest in addition to other public service work and press releases.

In 1946, the competition began with state contests. Farmers and breeders brought hatching eggs to purpose-built facilities where the chicks were hatched and then raised in controlled conditions. The chicks' rate of growth and health was monitored for 12 weeks. They were then slaughtered, weighed, and judged on the basis of edible meat produced.

In 1947, regional contests were held. From the regional contests, 40 finalists were selected to compete in the national competition for the title of "Chicken of Tomorrow". The final competition was held in 1948 at the University of Delaware Agricultural Experiment Station.

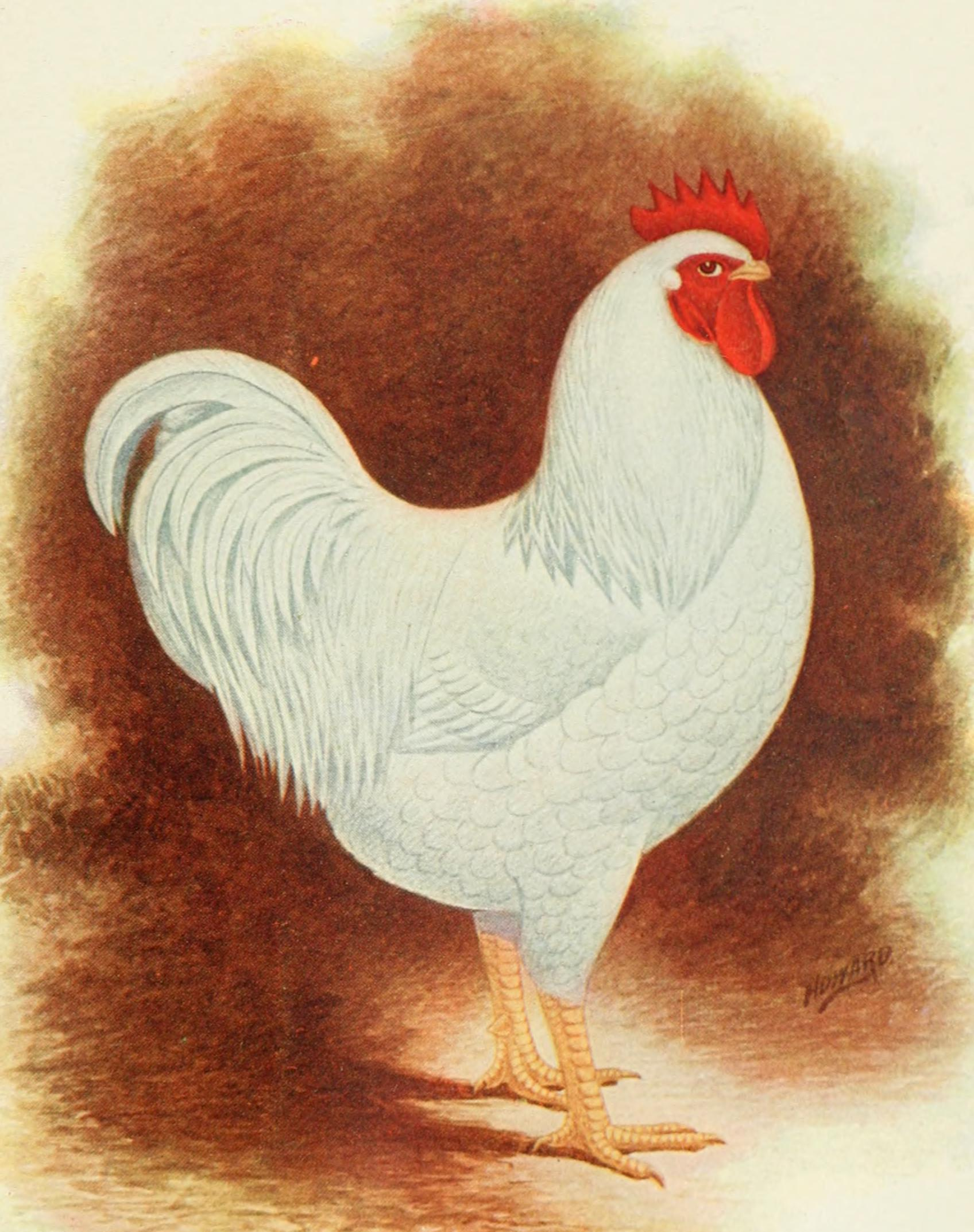
White Rock rooster

The winners of the contest in the purebred category were the White Rocks belonging to Henry Saglio of Arbor Acres farm. Saglio was the son of an Italian immigrant who grew fruits and vegetables on a small family farm in Glastonbury, Connecticut. Saglio began raising chickens in a small coop he made from an old piano. The Red Cornish crosses from the Vantress Hatchery won the overall contest. After his win, Saglio built his family farm into one of the leading poultry development companies. He created the Arbor Acre breed, a cross of his White Rocks and the Vantress Red Cornish. Today, the genetics from the line are found poultry farms globally.

In June 1948, the contest had a three mile long parade through Georgetown, Delaware which included a Chicken of Tomorrow Queen who rode in a carriage in the parade.

The contest is described in the 1948 documentary short film The Chicken of Tomorrow.
