= Tibial dyschondroplasia =

Metabolic disease of young poultry

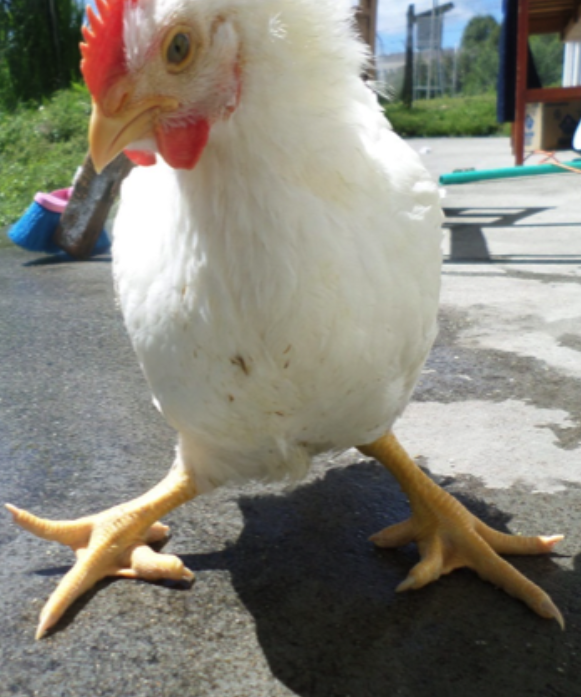
Tibial dyschondroplasia in a chicken

Tibial dyschondroplasia (TD) is a metabolic disease of young poultry that affects the growth of bone and cartilage. Often occurs in broilers (chickens raised for meat) and other poultry which have been bred for fast growth rates. The tibial cartilage does not mature enough to ossify (turn into bone). This leaves the growth plate prone to fracture, infection, and deformed bone development.

It is the leading cause of lameness, mortality, and carcass condemnations in commercial poultry.

== See also ==
- List of radiographic findings associated with cutaneous conditions
