= Ross 308 =

Breed of fast-growing chicken

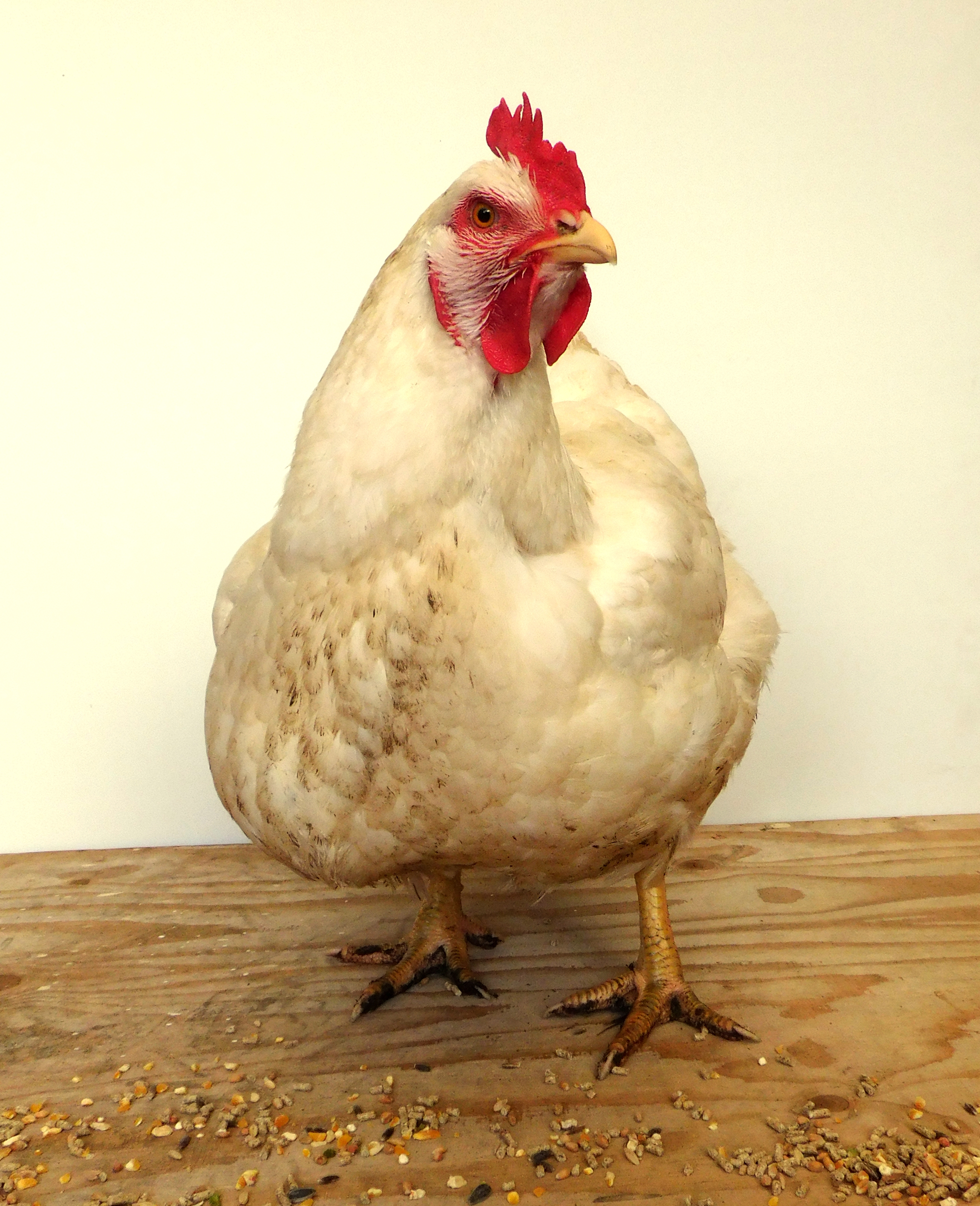
A Ross 308 bird at 30 weeks old (older than typical slaughter age)

The Ross 308 is a breed of fast-growing broiler chicken that can reach a 2.3 kg weight in around 35 days. They are widely used globally, but are controversial due to higher rates of health issues. Some animal rights and animal welfare groups, such as L214 and Open Cages, have called for the industry to switch away from the Ross 308. However, some researchers note that if chicken consumption isn't decreased at the same time, such a move might risk higher land usage, more chickens slaughtered, and worse crowding in CAFOs.

== History ==
The Ross 308 originates in the United Kingdom from the Ross Group. The Ross Poultry Group became part of Aviagen in 1998. Aviagen was then bought out by the EW Group in 2005. While they still breed the Ross 308 today, their distribution primarily happens through Industrias Bachoco, JBS, and BRF.

The Ross 308 started to gain a large market share globally in the 1980s. The exact timings of introduction to different parts of the world have varied. For instance, the Ross 308 was introduced to North America in 1994, Turkey around 1995—achieving 40% market share by 1999, introduced to South Africa in 2009, and India in 2015.

== Health issues ==
Like other fast-growing birds, the Ross 308 is linked to an increased risk for a number of different health conditions. Compared to slower-growing birds, the Ross 308 is at a higher risk of sudden death syndrome, hock burns, Tibial dyschondroplasia, and sees increased use of antibiotics among other issues. When comparing the amount of time in pain for fast-growing birds like the Ross 308 to slower-growing birds, "excruciating" pain averaged 5x higher, "disabling" pain 3x higher, "hurtful" pain 33% higher, and there was a very slight reduction in "annoying" pain.

== Breeding process ==
The Ross 308 is bred selectively. According to Aviagen, the Ross 308 selective breeding programme involves the assessment of more than 40 characteristics, over a third of which are focused on health and welfare traits, such as strong legs, heart and lung health and overall fitness. Other traits include feed conversion ratio, meat yield (defined as the proportion of edible meat), meat quality (specifically reduced genetic propensity for breast myopathies), and reproductive fitness. Aviagen claimed genetic improvements in selected health and welfare traits including gait and leg defects since the 2010s.

== Phase-out attempts ==
Due to welfare concerns, some producers and distributors have attempted to switch away from the Ross 308 to slower-growing birds with varying degrees of endurance. Danpo, which is one of the largest producers of chickens in Denmark, tried moving over to slower-growing birds starting in 2021. They reverted that decision in September 2023 after higher prices dissuaded consumers. In 2019, KFC made pledges to phase out the use of any fast-growing chickens by 2026 but has since dropped its pledge after making limited progress. In 2017, US chicken producer Bell & Evans announced plans to phase out fast-growing chickens in 2018 but have since reverted. Emmer & Co and Cooks Venture attempted to avoid the use of antibiotics and fast-growing chicken from the start and have since gone out of business after struggling to get more investors.

A 2017 European Union commissioned study theorized most of the difficulties with switching away originate from consumer aversion to its higher prices and lack of awareness of issues with fast-growing breeds. Despite some legislators encouraging slow-growing birds, the rates of fast-growing bird usage remained high, with slow-growing birds making up less than 5% of most EU member states. Ross lines in particular made up 70% of EU broilers, with the Ross 308 being a substantial percentage of that.

However, in January 2026, the Norwegian poultry sector announced that it would be phasing out the Ross 308 by the end of 2027.

== See also ==
- Cobb 500
