= Chicken harvester =

Machine used in poultry farming

A chicken harvester is a machine used in poultry farming to gather chickens (typically broilers) for slaughter.

== Description and function ==
Since broilers are not kept in cages, some method is required to catch the chickens. The traditional hand method was to corral the birds, catch them, grab them by the feet, five per hand (typically), and then drop the animals into crates. This is a backbreaking job, said to be "the worst in the poultry industry".

The chicken harvester machines, by contrast, use different systems to collect and deposit the chickens onto a conveyor belt which then moves and cage them into crates or containers, to transfer them to subsequent processing. Chicken harvesters can harvest from 18 up to 26 tons of birds per hour (about 8000 birds per hour – average bird weight 2,5 kg).

Studies have demonstrated that the use of chicken harvesters may be less stressful to the birds compared to being hand-wrangled by humans. The use of the machines has also been demonstrated to reduce injuries to chickens compared to those that occur from hand-wrangling, especially in wings and legs. In addition, while the machine does not reduce the number of man hours required to process the animals, it is said to be easier on the workers. A British study found that a mechanical catcher reduced some injuries by as much as 50%. Other studies indicated more modest improvements of 9.5%

Paul S. Berry of the British Silsoe Research Institute is credited with the development of the machine, starting in the 1980s. The British government provided $200,000 a year to design the machine, with hopes of reducing livestock suffering. Earlier mechanical machines used a vacuum method.

== Use in the industry ==
In 2003, about 5% of U.S. birds were caught mechanically.

The Italian company CMC Industries (former Ciemmecalabria), is maybe the most famous manufacturer of this type of machinery with the Apollo chicken harvester range (few thousand machines sold around the globe since 1972). Its models do not use the rubber fingers to catch the chickens, as other manufactures do, but a system of conveyor belts which results in a gentle and smooth way to collect the birds. In addition, the Apollo harvester are capable of weighing the birds being loaded. The capacity of the machine can be up to 26 tons of birds per hour (10.000 birds per hour – average weight 2.6 kg).

Anglia Autoflow has developed a chicken harvester named the Easyload Harvester.

The company Bright Coop had made for few years the E-Z Catch Chicken Harvester, capable of handling 5000 birds per hour.

The Lewis/Mola Company had manufactured for some years the PH2000-model chicken harvester, said to be one of the more popular models in US, and able to clean 24,000 birds in 3 1/2 hours. In 2003, a typical machine might cost around $200,000, and was described as 9 tons and 42 feet long. Tyson Foods began using the PH2000 in 2001, but discontinued their use in 2009 due to high maintenance costs for the machines. In addition, labor costs in the poultry industry went down in the first decade of the 21st century, making manual processing relatively cheaper.
