= Cobb 500 =

Breed of fast-growing chicken

The Cobb 500 is a fast-growing broiler chicken breed. They can reach a 2 kg slaughter weight at 33 days old. They make up around half of all globally farmed chickens as of 2016. The Cobb 500 is controversial due to their health problems. Animal rights and animal welfare groups such as Open Cages have called for the industry to stop their use.

== History ==
The Cobb lineage descends from the Vantress chicken, which was bred for the USDA's Chicken of Tomorrow contest in the 1940s. The Cobb line itself saw its initial development in the 1970s in England by Cobb-Vantress. The Cobb 500 in particular was introduced into the United States in 1985. In response, the US producer Tyson Foods acquired a 50% stake in Cobb-Vantress in 1986. In 1994, Tyson acquired full control of the company. The Cobb 500's share of all chickens has increased in the decades since.

In 2008, all Cobb line birds made up around 30-40% of global broilers. In 2016, the Cobb 500 alone was nearly 50%. More broadly, fast-growing chickens now make up the vast majority of the global chicken supply. As of 2021, 90% of the global broiler population is part of either the Cobb or Ross lines, which are both fast-growing.

== Health issues ==
The fast growth of the Cobb 500 is associated with an increased rate of various health problems. Compared to slower-growing chickens, they have a higher rate of sudden death syndrome, hock burns, tibial dyschondroplasia, weaker disease resistance and antibody response, bone deformations, and problems with walking.

== See also ==
- Ross 308
