= Poultry farming in the United States =

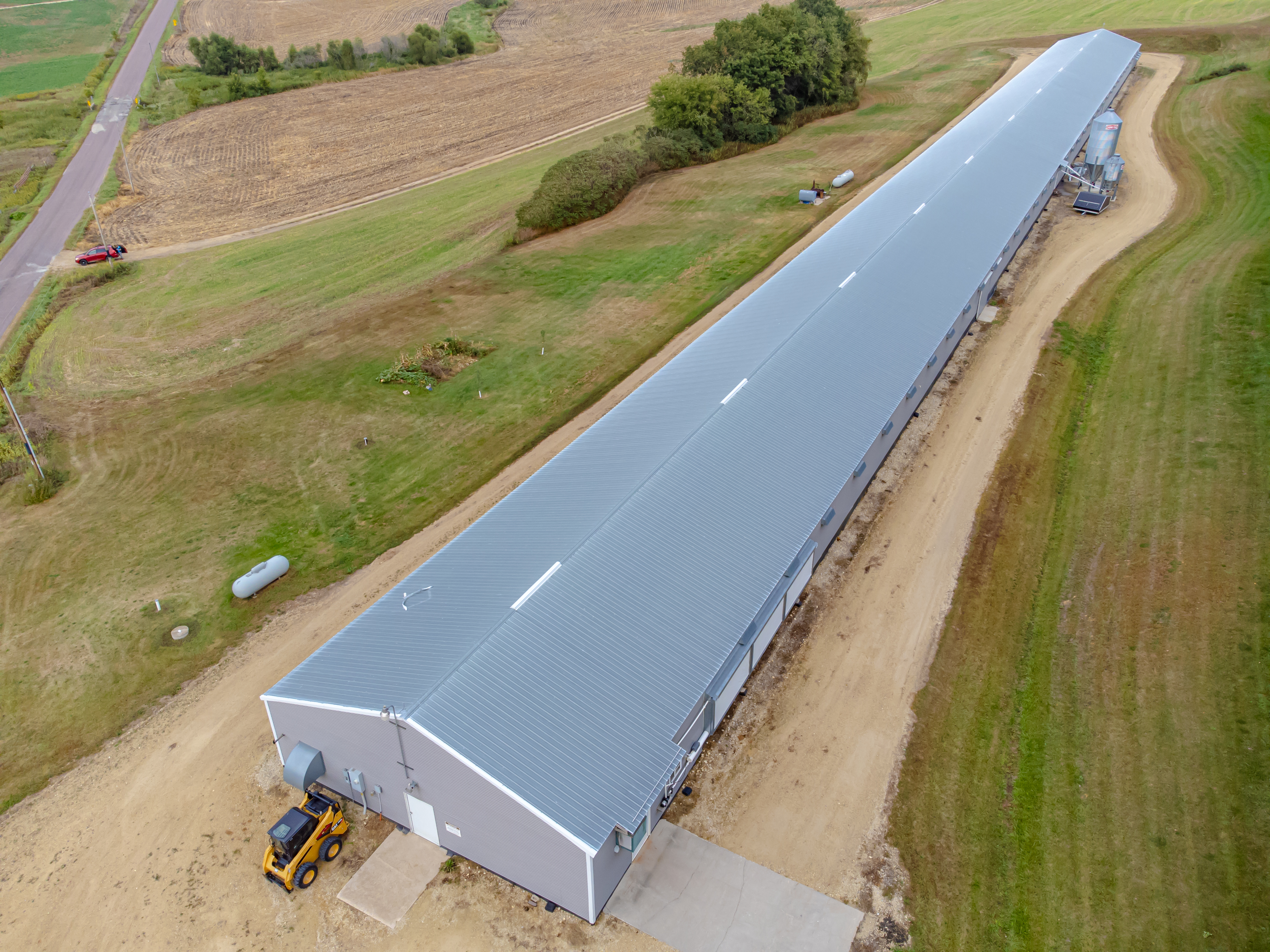
Poultry farm in Arcadia, Wisconsin

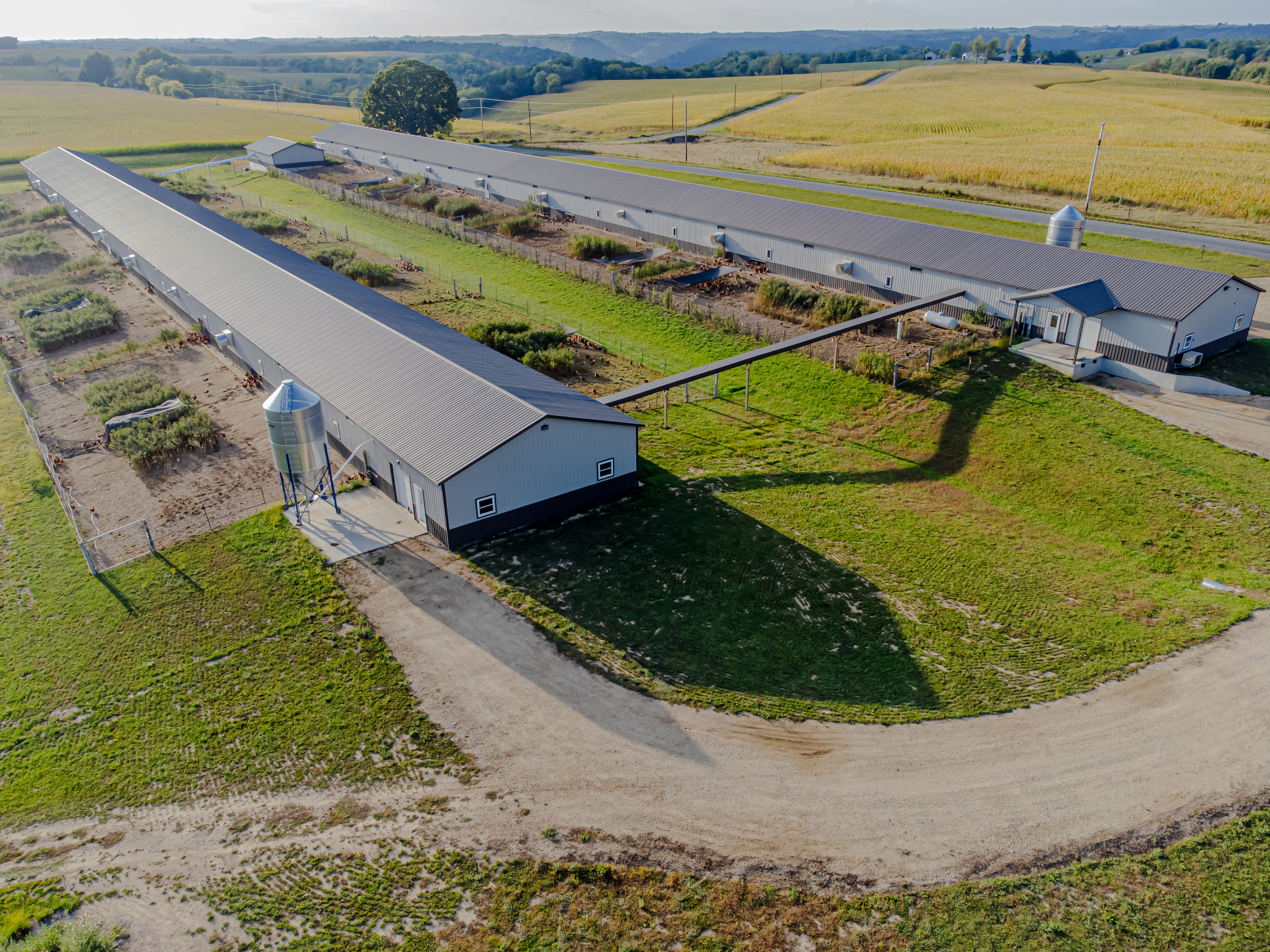
Yarding poultry farm in Vernon County, Wisconsin

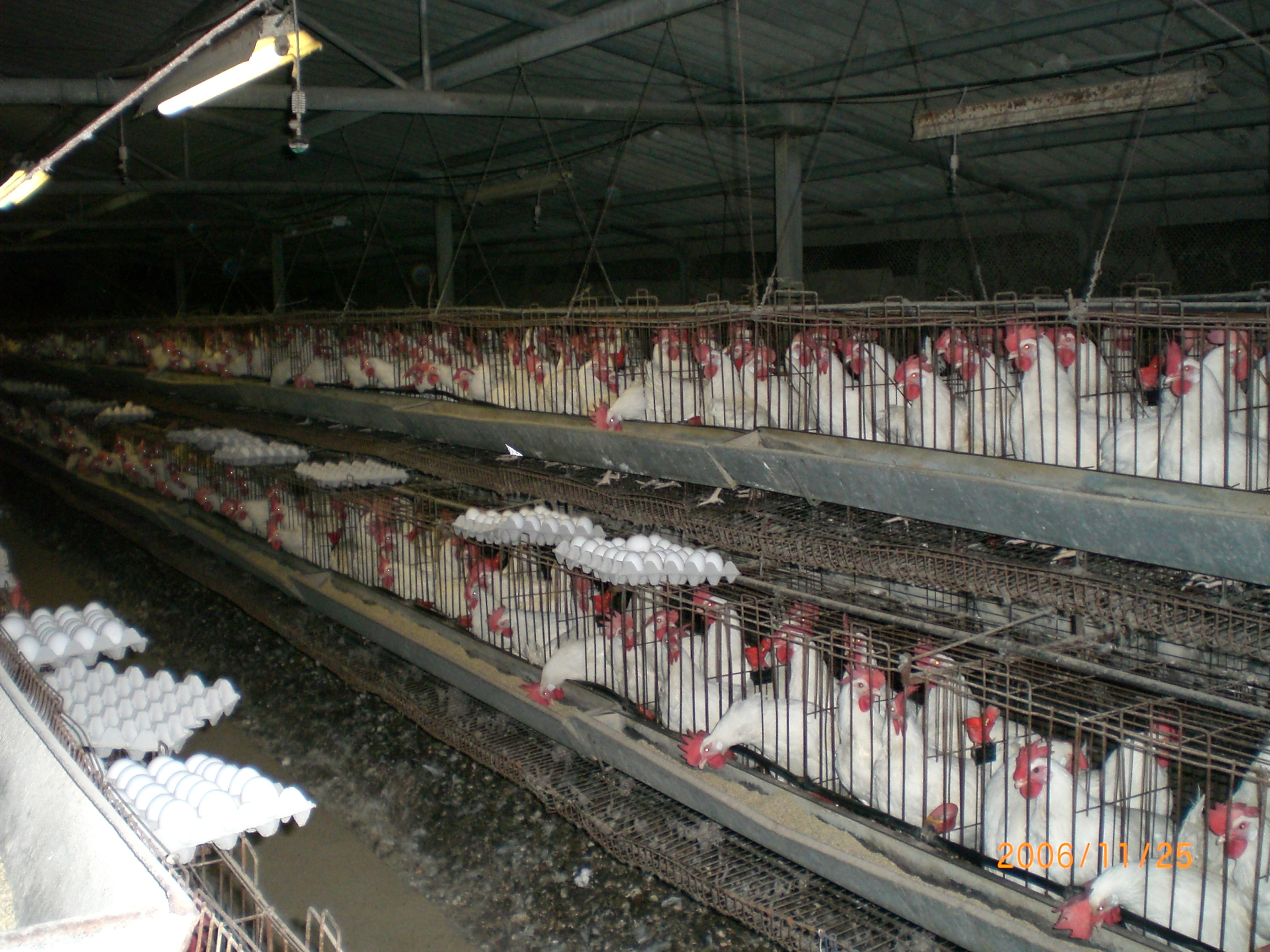
Battery chickens

Poultry farming is a part of the United States's agricultural economy.

== Industry overview ==
=== Broilers ===
Notable companies in the chicken production market of the USA include Tyson Foods, Pilgrim's Pride, Sanderson Farms, and Perdue Farms.

Most farmers produce their chicken contracted out by one of the large chicken processing companies. Farmers operate three types of farms: pullet farms, breeder farms, and broiler farms.

In 2024, 9.4 billion broiler chickens were slaughtered, up from 8.1 billion in 1999.

=== Eggs ===
The total number of egg-laying hens in 2024 was estimated at 375 million across the USA.

The largest egg producer is Cal-Maine.

== Current status ==
Today, eggs are produced on large egg ranches on which environmental parameters are controlled. Chickens are exposed to artificial light cycles to stimulate egg production year-round. In addition, it is a common practice to induce molting through manipulation of light and the amount of food they receive in order to further increase egg size and production.

On average, a chicken lays one egg a day for a number of days (a "clutch"), then does not lay for one or more days, then lays another clutch. Originally, the hen presumably laid one clutch, became broody, and incubated the eggs. Selective breeding over the centuries has produced hens that lay more eggs than they can hatch. Some of this progress was ancient, but most occurred after 1900. In 1900, average egg production was 83 eggs per hen per year. In 2000, it was well over 300.

In the United States, laying hens are butchered after their second egg laying season. In Europe, they are generally butchered after a single season. The laying period begins when the hen is about 18–20 weeks old (depending on breed and season). Males of the egg-type breeds have little commercial value at any age, and all those not used for breeding (roughly fifty percent of all egg-type chickens) are killed soon after hatching. Such "day-old chicks" are sometimes sold as food for captive and falconers birds of prey. The old hens also have little commercial value. Thus, the main sources of poultry meat a hundred years ago (spring chickens and stewing hens) have both been entirely supplanted by meat-type broiler chickens.

Traditionally, chicken production was distributed across the entire agricultural sector. In the 20th century, it gradually moved closer to major cities to take advantage of lower shipping costs. This had the undesirable side effect of turning the chicken manure from a valuable fertilizer that could be used profitably on local farms to an unwanted byproduct. This trend may be reversing itself due to higher disposal costs on the one hand and higher fertilizer prices on the other, making farm regions attractive once more.

From the farmer's point of view, eggs used to be practically the same as currency, with general stores buying eggs for a stated price per dozen. Egg production peaks in the early spring, when farm expenses are high and income is low. On many farms, the flock was the most important source of income, though this was often not appreciated by the farmers, since the money arrived in many small payments. Eggs were a farm operation where even small children could make a valuable contribution.

In 2015, the national flock suffered due to the spread of bird flu, affecting birds in fourteen states, leading to layoffs. A May 2015 report by the Associated Press reported that 10% of egg laying chickens were dead or dying due to bird flu. Beginning in June 2015, rationing of eggs had begun, leading to increased egg prices.

== Production statistics ==
=== Eggs ===
Between 2007 and 2010, a total of about 90 billion eggs were produced per year.

==== Individual states ====
Production of individual states

Egg production by state, 2010
State	Eggs produced (millions)
AL	2,182
AR	2,894
CA	5,390
CO	1,066
CT	695
FL	2,592
GA	4,419
HI	69.5
IL	1,272
IN	6,493
IA	14,614
KY	1,119
LA	462
ME	1,034
MD	616
MA	36
MI	2,912
MN	2,869
MS	1,467
MO	1,949
MT	119
NE	2,751
NY	1,161
NC	3,251
OH	7,535

State	Eggs produced (millions)
OK	769
OR	715
PA	6,976
SC	1,102
SD	672
TN	308
TX	4,811
UT	929
VT	59
VA	729
WA	1,739
WV	267
WI	1,312
WY	2.4
AK, AZ, DE, ID, KS, ND, NH, NJ, NM, NV, RI	2,042

=== Meat ===
In 2008, 9.08 billion chickens were slaughtered in the United States according to United States Department of Agriculture data.

== Recommended culling practices ==
The American Veterinary Medical Association recommends cervical dislocation and asphyxiation by carbon dioxide as the best options, but has recently amended their guidelines to include maceration, putting non-anesthetized chicks through a grinder.

The 2005–2006 American Veterinary Medical Association Executive Board held its final meeting July 13 in Honolulu, prior to the 2006 session of the House of Delegates and the AVMA Annual Convention. It proposed a policy change, which was recommended by the Animal Welfare Committee on disposal of unwanted chicks, poults, and pipped eggs. The new policy states, in part, "Unwanted chicks, poults, and pipped eggs should be killed by an acceptable humane method, such as use of a commercially designed macerator that results in instantaneous death. Smothering unwanted chicks or poults in bags or containers is not acceptable. Pips, unwanted chicks, or poults should be killed prior to disposal. A pipped egg, or pip, is one where the chick or poult has not been successful in escaping the egg shell during the hatching process."

== Negative effects on poultry workers ==
In 2010, Human Rights Watch described slaughterhouse line work in the United States as a human rights crime. In a report by Oxfam America, slaughterhouse workers were observed not be allowed breaks, were often required to wear diapers, and were paid below minimum wage. Slaughterhouses in the United States commonly illegally employed and exploited underage workers and undocumented immigrants. American slaughterhouse workers were three times more likely to suffer serious injury than the average American worker. The Guardian reports that on average there are two amputations a week involving slaughterhouse workers in the United States. On average, one employee of Tyson Foods, the largest meat producer in America, is injured and amputates a finger or limb per month.

The act of slaughtering animals, or of raising or transporting animals for slaughter, may engender psychological stress or trauma in the people involved. A 2016 study in Organization indicates, "Regression analyses of data from 10,605 Danish workers across 44 occupations suggest that slaughterhouse workers consistently experience lower physical and psychological well-being along with increased incidences of negative coping behavior." A 2009 study by criminologist Amy Fitzgerald indicates, "slaughterhouse employment increases total arrest rates, arrests for violent crimes, arrests for rape, and arrests for other sex offenses in comparison with other industries."

== Safety issues ==
Poultry production is regulated by the FDA, UL and OSHA. Due to the potential safety hazards of broken glass and chemicals like mercury and phosphors in consumable products, all lights within poultry production facilities must be safety coated. The USDA's Food Safety and Inspection Service performs frequent checks on production facilities to ensure poultry is safe, wholesome and correctly labelled.

=== Salmonella ===
According to ProPublica, the food safety system for poultry in the United States is "ill-equipped to protect consumers or rebuff industry influence." The U.S. poultry industry is regulated by the U.S. Department of Agriculture, which has been characterized as toothless and beholden to business interests. The USDA does not stop companies from selling poultry contaminated with dangerous strains of Salmonella, does not have the power to suspend operations in contaminated plants, and does not have power to order recalls. As a consequence, Salmonella outbreaks are frequent in the U.S. whereas they have dramatically reduced in comparable European countries over time.

=== Chlorinated chicken ===
In the United States it is common practice for chicken carcasses to be washed with antimicrobial rinses in order to remove harmful bacteria.

These rinses, containing chlorine dioxide solution, acidified sodium chlorite, trisodium phosphate or peroxyacids, are often referred to as Pathogen Reduction Treatments. The process is said to reduce the prevalence of Salmonella from 14% to 2%. Since 1997, the European Union has refused to permit the import of chicken treated in this way, claiming that it compensates for poor hygiene behavior earlier in the supply chain and disincentivises in the poultry industry to adopt proper hygiene practices. American producers claimed that this was protectionism.

=== Antibiotic resistance ===
The use of human antibiotics in chickens created antibiotic resistance that has spread to human pathogens and been documented in outbreaks.

== Environmental issues ==
The Illinois River, which flows between Arkansas and Oklahoma, has had a high level of pollution due to water runoff contaminated with chicken manure. The incineration of poultry wastes has been shown to have dangerous levels of a number of airborne pollutants, including heavy metals, arsenic, and halogens such as chlorine.

== History ==
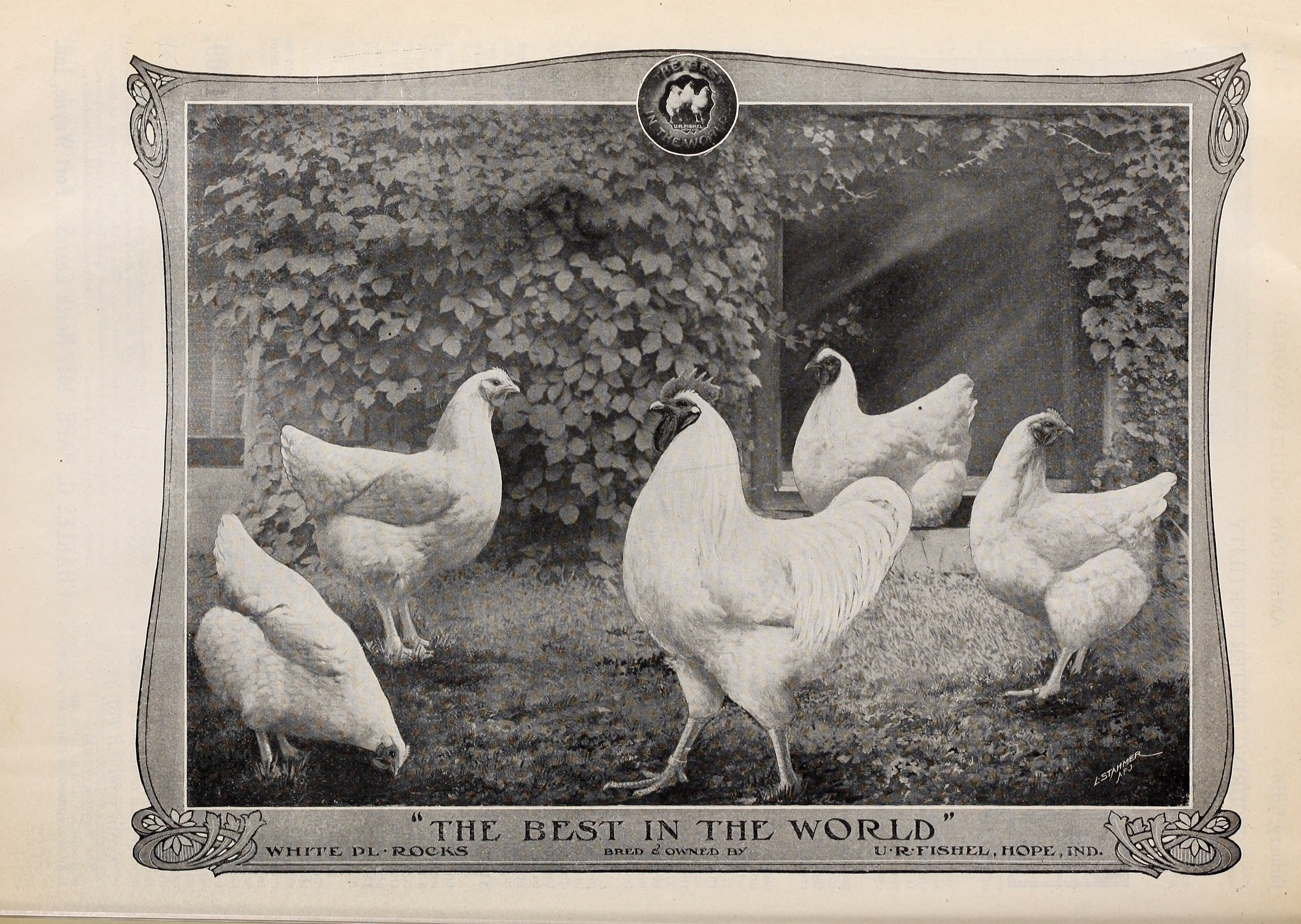
"The best in the world" White Plymouth Rocks, 1910

In the United States, chickens were raised primarily on family farms or in some cases, in poultry colonies, such as Judge Emery's Poultry Colony until about 1960. Originally, the primary value in poultry keeping was eggs, and meat was considered a byproduct of egg production. A United States Department of the Interior census in 1840 found American farmers had a total combined poultry flock valued at approximately $12 million ($387 million in today's dollars).

Following the Treaty of Wanghia between the US and China in 1844, oriental poultry breeds were imported to New England, and Rhode Island became the nation's first major poultry center. Cross-breeding between English and Asian birds created new breeds still common today, like the Barred Plymouth Rock. Chickens remained primarily to provide eggs, mostly to the farmer (subsistence agriculture), with commercialization still largely unexplored. Farm flocks tended to be small because the hens largely fed themselves through foraging, with some supplementation of grain, scraps, and waste products from other farm ventures. Such feedstuffs were in limited supply, especially in the winter, and this tended to regulate the size of the farm flocks. Soon after poultry keeping gained the attention of agricultural researchers (around 1896), improvements in nutrition and management made poultry keeping more profitable and businesslike.

In 1896, farmer Nettie Metcalf created the Buckeye chicken breed in Warren, Ohio. In 1905, Buckeyes became an official breed under the American Poultry Association. The Buckeye breed is the first recorded chicken breed to be created and developed by a woman.

Poultry shows spread interest and understanding, with 88% of all farmers having chickens by 1910.

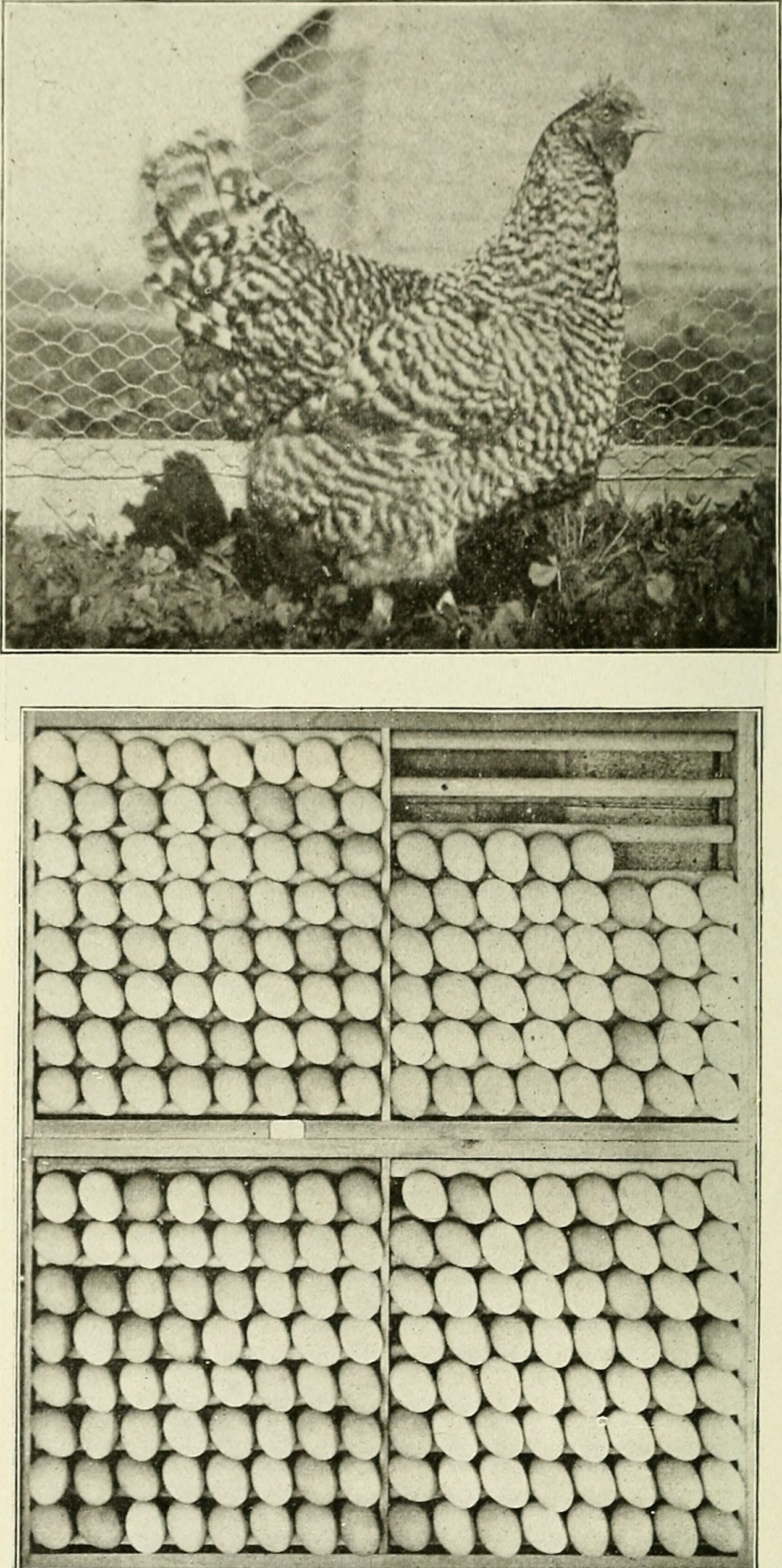
Barred Plymouth Rock hen, No. 31S. laid 237 eggs in first year at the Maine Agricultural Experiment Station (1903)

As the United States urbanized, demand for eggs grew. Eggs were sold into urban markets, where residents did not have chickens to provide eggs for themselves. Except in hot weather, eggs can be shipped and stored without refrigeration for some time before going bad; this was important in the days before widespread refrigeration. With a steady demand for eggs, efforts to create a poultry egg industry began in earnest, but raising poultry remained challenging; early efforts at industrial-scale indoor poultry houses led to problems with diseases like coccidiosis, Marek's disease, and vitamin D deficiency were not well understood. Egg production was largely increased by scientific breeding rather than industrial scale. After a few false starts, such as the Maine Experiment Station's failure at improving egg production, success was shown by Professor James Dryden at the Oregon Experiment Station.

The culling and slaughter of non-egg laying chickens created a source of poultry meat. However, poultry meat supply continued to lag demand, and poultry was expensive. Prior to about 1910, chicken was served primarily on special occasions or Sunday dinner. For example, Herbert Hoover's campaign used the slogan "A chicken in every pot" during the 1928 United States presidential election, appealing to a middle-class sense of affluence in the Post WWI years. Poultry was shipped live or killed, plucked, and packed on ice (but not eviscerated). Two kinds of poultry were generally offered: broilers or "spring chickens", young male chickens, a byproduct of the egg industry, which were sold when still young and tender (generally under 3 pounds live weight); and "fowls" or "stewing hens", also a byproduct of the egg industry, which were old hens past their prime for laying. This is no longer practiced; modern meat chickens are a different breed. Egg-type chicken carcasses no longer appear in stores. In 1942, the country had its first government-approved chicken evisceration plant. The "whole, ready-to-cook broiler" was not popular until the 1950s, when end-to-end refrigeration and sanitary practices gave consumers more confidence. Before this, poultry were often cleaned by the neighborhood butcher, though cleaning poultry at home was a commonplace kitchen skill.

=== Industrialization ===
The major milestone in 20th century poultry production was the discovery of vitamin D (named in 1922), which made it possible to keep chickens in confinement year-round. Before this, chickens did not thrive during the winter due to lack of sunlight, and egg production, incubation, and meat production in the off-season were all very difficult, making poultry a seasonal and expensive proposition. Year-round production lowered costs, especially for broilers. Artificial daylight supplementation also started being used.

Improvements in production and quality were accompanied by lower labor requirements. In the 1930s through the early 1950s, 1,500 hens was considered to be a full-time job for a farm family. In the late 1950s, egg prices had fallen so dramatically that farmers typically tripled the number of hens they kept, putting three hens into what had been a single-bird cage or converting their floor-confinement houses from a single deck of roosts to triple-decker roosts. Not long after this, prices fell still further and large numbers of egg farmers left the business. This marked the beginning of the transition from family farms to larger, vertically integrated operations.

This fall in profitability was accompanied by a general fall in prices to the consumer, allowing poultry and eggs to lose their status as luxury foods.

The vertical integration of the egg and poultry industries was a late development, occurring after all the major technological changes had been in place for years (including the development of modern broiler rearing techniques, the adoption of the Cornish Cross broiler, the use of laying cages, etc.).

By the late 1950s, poultry production had changed dramatically. Large farms and packing plants could grow birds by the tens of thousands, radically impacting labor practices alongside farming techniques. Chickens could be sent to slaughterhouses for butchering and processing into prepackaged commercial products to be frozen or shipped fresh to markets or wholesalers. Meat-type chickens currently grow to market weight in six to seven weeks whereas only fifty years ago it took three times as long. This is due to genetic selection and nutritional modifications and not the use of growth hormones, which are illegal for use in poultry in the US and many other countries. Once a meat consumed only occasionally, the common availability and lower cost has made chicken a common meat product within developed nations. Growing concerns over the cholesterol content of red meat in the 1980s and 1990s further resulted in increased consumption of chicken.

== See also ==
- Agriculture in the United States
- California Proposition 2 (2008) which enacted the Prevention of Farm Animal Cruelty Act
- Chicken tax
- Harold V. Biellier – a noted poultry scientist
- History of agriculture in the United States
- Poultry Science Association – a non-profit professional organization for the advancement of poultry science
