= Hy-Line International =

Genetics company

- Company type: Private
- Industry: Hatchery
- Founded: West Des Moines, Iowa (1936)
- Headquarters: West Des Moines, Iowa, U.S.
- Key people: Jonathan Cade, President
- Parent: EW Group
- Website: Hy-Line.com

Hy-Line International or Hy-Line is a multi-national genetics company that raises and sells commercial/industrial laying chickens. It is a subsidiary of the German EW Group. The firm has subsidiaries in multiple countries including Brazil, Japan, and the United Kingdom and has 60 distributors in more than 50 countries worldwide.

== Corporate ==
The firm is a subsidiary of the privately owned German livestock breeding company EW Group. Its president is Jonathan Cade; Thomas Dixon serves as the firm's director of international sales and marketing

== Operations ==
Hy-Line directly operates subsidiaries in the United Kingdom, Italy, Australia, Brazil, and South Africa. Many of its subsidiaries were formerly distributors bought out by Hy-Line, including Hy-Line Italia (formerly Valversa) and Hy-Line South Africa (formerly Hy-Line Chicks). In several countries it has instead signed exclusivity deals with distributors. In India, Amrit Group has distributed Hy-Line chickens since July 2014 when a new 'poultry hub' was established as part of plans to capture 30% of the Indian egg-laying market by 2017–2018. Sales in Vietnam are exclusively licensed to the Ba Haun Company since 2013.

== Products ==
Products of the company include the Hy-Line W-36, Brown, and Silver Brown lines.

== Criticism ==
Hy-Line International has been subject to criticism from animal rights group Mercy for Animals following the release of a video alleged to have been filmed inside of a Hy-Line hatchery, showing the process of chick culling. The video went viral and received widespread media attention across the English-speaking world.

Hy-Line Australia was sued in 2013 for unsafe practices at its chicken hatchery at Huntly near Bendigo, after a fire in one of its sheds in April 2009 left an employee trapped due to a lack of fire exits. The man escaped by breaking through floorboards. The case was settled out of court for an undisclosed sum.

== Sponsorships ==
Hy-Line Australia is the name-sponsor of the Hy-Line Australia Oval, which is a home ground of the Heathcote District Football League. It also sponsors the Hy-Line International Research Award of the Poultry Science Association.

== See also ==
- American Veterinary Medical Association
- American Association of Avian Pathologists
- Poultry Science Association
- ISA Brown
