= Janet Scott =

Janet Scott may refer to:

- Janet G. Scott (1894–?), Scottish scholar of English and French literature
- Janet Scott, Lady Ferniehirst (c. 1548–after 1593), Scottish landowner
- Janet Scott (scientist) (1964–2022), South African chemist
- Janet Scott Salmon Blyth (1902–1972), Scottish geneticist
- Janet Scott, in the British TV series Scott & Bailey, played by Lesley Sharp

== See also ==
- Janette Scott (born 1938), English actress
