= James Wyllie Gregor =

Scottish botanist (1900–1980)

Dr James Wyllie Gregor CBE FRSE FLS FIB (1900–1980) was a Scottish botanist. He served as director of the Scottish Plant Breeding Station from 1950 to 1965.

== Life ==
He was born on Innerwick Farm near Dunbar on 14 January 1900. He was educated at St. Mary's School, Melrose then Edinburgh Academy. His education was interrupted by the First World War, joining the Royal Flying Corps in 1917 and returning to civilian life in 1919.

He then studied at the East of Scotland Agricultural College, before taking a postgraduate course at the University of Edinburgh gaining a doctorate (PhD) in 192 with his thesis The pollination of some important agricultural grasses with a view to improved methods of breeding. He began working at the Scottish Plant Breeding Station in 1924, in time becoming its director. In 1929 he was elected a fellow of the Linnean Society. His gained a second doctorate (DSc) from the University of Edinburgh in 1939 with his research on experimental taxonomy. In 1957 he was elected a fellow of the Royal Society of Edinburgh. His proposers were Alan William Greenwood, Stephen John Watson, Hugh Paterson Donald, and William Black. In 1961 he was made a Commander of the Order of the British Empire (CBE).

In later life he lived at the Old Mill House, Lanark Road West in Balerno, south-west of Edinburgh. He died on 30 September 1980.

== Family ==
In 1929, he married Mary Joanne Farquharson.
