= Hugh Paterson Donald =

New Zealand-born, British biologist (1908–1989)

Hugh Paterson Donald CBE FRSE (1908–1989) was a New Zealand-born, British biologist, noteworthy as an important contributor to Peter Medawar's research on skin grafts.

Hugh P. Donald was educated at Lincoln College in New Zealand, where he acquired three degrees and training as a plant geneticist. At the beginning of his career he was interested in finding new varieties of wheat, but the plant geneticist Otto Frankel advised him that there were more job opportunities in agricultural research on animals. In 1934 Donald joined Edinburgh University's Institute of Animal Genetics. There for two years from 1934 to 1936 he did research under the supervision of Rowena Lamy on Drosophila genetics and completed his Ph.D. thesis in 1936. According to the geneticist A. H. Sturtevant's A History of Genetics, Francis Crew and Rowena Lamy gave in 1935 an explanation for why some specific mutations were autosomal in one fruit-fly species and sex-linked in a closely related fruit-fly species, and the explanation was confirmed in 1936 by Donald. In 1936 he was appointed junior lecturer in animal husbandry and assistant to Alick Buchanan-Smith at the Institute of Animal Genetics, Shothead Farm, Balerno. There Donald ran both the farm and the breeding programme, did research and much of the manual farm work, and also taught undergraduates.

In the 1930s he worked with cytologists, geneticists, pharmacologists and his colleagues included Auerbach, Muller, Greenwood, Buchanan-Smith and Koller who all contributed to the new science of agricultural and pure genetics. Donald improved the quality and production of pigs, and by extension led to the improved quality of livestock generally.

As successor to Robert George White, Donald held an appointment from 1951 to 1973 as Director of the Agricultural Research Council's Animal Breeding Research Organisation (ABRO). He held an appointment from 1973 to 1989 as Honorary Professor at the University of Edinburgh. He was the coauthor with I. Michael Lerner of Modern Developments in Animal Breeding.

In the 1950s Hugh Donald laid the foundation for human organ transplantation when he grafted skin between cattle twins.

ABRO grew under his directorship to run six farms in the UK developing improved breeds such as Friesian, Ayrshire, Jersey cattle, and Blackface sheep. Donald was one of the first scientists to transfer embryos between different varieties of sheep. His studies of identical and fraternal twin cattle successfully improved fertility, body weight and milk flow.

== Awards and honors ==
- 1937 — Elected Fellow of the Royal Society of Edinburgh
- 1974 — Awarded Commander of the British Empire
- 1974–1975 — President of the British Society of Animal Production

== Selected publications ==
- Donald, H. P. (1937). "Suckling and suckling preference in pigs". Empire Journal of Experimental Agriculture. 5: 361–368.
- Donald, H. P.; Hancock, J. L. (1953). "Evidence of gene-controlled sterility in bulls". The Journal of Agricultural Science. 43 (2): 178–181. doi:10.1017/S0021859600044944.
- Donald, H. P. (1955). "Controlled heterozygosity in livestock". Proceedings of the Royal Society of London. Series B, Biological Sciences. 144 (915): 192–203. Bibcode:1955RSPSB.144..192D. doi:10.1098/rspb.1955.0046. PMID 13266802. S2CID 46275513.
- Donald, H. P.; Read, J. L. (1967). "The performance of Finnish Landrace sheep in Britain". Animal Science. 9 (4): 471–476. doi:10.1017/S0003356100042033.
- Donald, H. P.; Read, J. L.; Russell, W. S. (1968). "A comparative trial of crossbred ewes by Finnish Landrace and other sires". Animal Science. 10 (4): 413–421. doi:10.1017/S000335610002643X.
- Donald, H. P.; Russell, W. S. (1970). "The relationship between live weight of ewe at mating and weight of newborn lamb". Animal Science. 12 (2): 273–280. doi:10.1017/S000335610003885X.
