= JAPR =

JAPR may refer to:

- José Antonio Primo de Rivera, Founder of Falange Española
- Journal of Applied Poultry Research, a journal of the Poultry Science Organisation
