= Sanford Sterling Munro =

Canadian zoologist and geneticist

Sanford Sterling Munro FRSE FSA (20 May 1908 – June 1971) was a 20th-century Canadian zoologist and geneticist.

== Life ==
He was born in Fredericton, New Brunswick on 20 May 1908 the son of Voloma Blanche Smith and her husband, David Munro.

He studied zoology at McGill University and specialised in poultry genetics. He began working for the Canadian Department of Agriculture in Ottawa and was involved in the Canadian Experimental Farm System.

Around 1935, he went to work in the Institute of Animal Genetics in Edinburgh, in Great Britain. Here he worked under Francis Albert Eley Crew and alongside Alan William Greenwood.

In 1938, he was elected a Fellow of the Royal Society of Edinburgh. His proposers were Francis Albert Eley Crew, Alan William Greenwood, Alexander Aitken, and Lancelot Hogben. He resigned from the Society in 1948.

He held a BSA from McGill University in Canada and a Master of Science from The University of Wisconsin in Madison. He earned his Doctorate of Science from the University of Edinburgh in 1937. (information confirmed through the University of Edinburgh Archives)

He died in Des Moines, Iowa in USA in June 1971 aged 63.

== Family ==
He was married to Dorothea Irene Spears. Their six children included the political aide S. Sterling Munro Jr.
