= Planasa =

Spanish fruit and herb cultivating company

Planasa (TIGRUTI ITG SL)
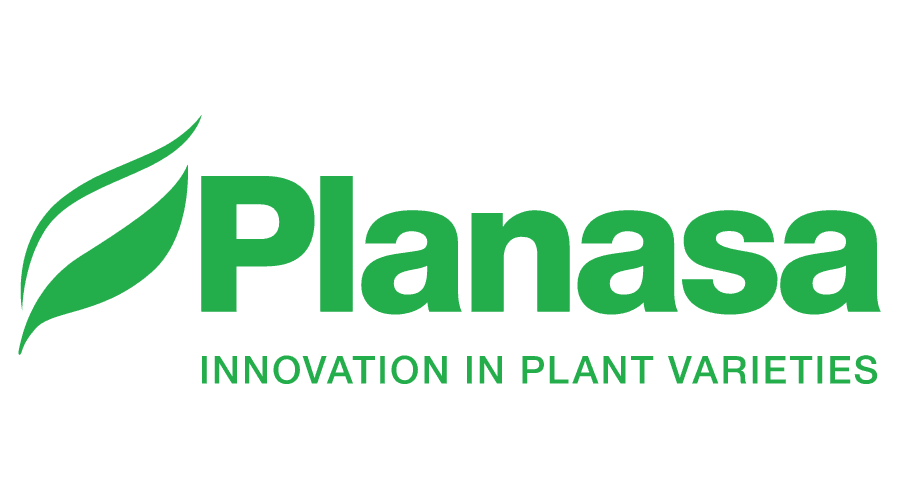
- Company type: S.A.
- Industry: Agriculture, Life Sciences
- Founded: 1973; 52 years ago
- Headquarters: Valtierra, Spain
- Key people: Michael Brinkmann (CEO)
- Operating income: around €220 million (2023/24)
- Number of employees: Around 7,000 (2024)
- Website: planasa.com

Planasa is a Spanish agricultural company headquartered in Valtierra (Navarra, Spain). It is a corporate group that operates within the agricultural and food sector in more than 27 countries worldwide.

Planasa specialises in breeding and developing the next generation berry varieties, including blueberries, blackberries, raspberries and strawberries. Additionally, Planasa has breeding programs for garlic, asparagus, avocado and cherry trees, and is the global market leader in the production of fresh endives in the European Union and one of the biggest nurseries in the world.

Planasa is part of the German EW Group, better known as Erich Wesjohann Group and its CEO since 2020 is Michael Brinkmann.

== History ==
Planasa Group’s origin dates back to the year 1887 and was formally established in 1973 under the name of Plantas de Navarra, S.A., by Amand Marc Darbonne and Caja de Ahorros de Navarra.

In its early years, the company focused on strawberry and asparagus breeding and endives production. In 2003, Planasa introduced the Sabrosa strawberry variety in the market, commercially known as Candonga. It was followed by the Sabrina variety in 2010. Both varieties ranked among the most popular strawberries worldwide and dominate numerous growing regions, including Spain and Italy. Also in between 2010 and 2011 operations started in Mexico and the USA.

In 2014 the group acquired California Endive Farms. This made Planasa one of the leading producers of endives in the world.

In 2003 the Group Darbonne took control of the 100% of Planasa until 2017, when the majority of the company’s shares (65%) were acquired by Cinven, a British private equity firm based in London. While the other 35% was held by the Group Darbonne, with Alexandre Pierron-Darbonne as CEO.

In 2018, Planasa launched the Savana and Sayulita strawberry varieties. And two years later, released a new generation of six blueberry varieties, the leading ones being Blue Manila, Blue Malibu, Blue Maldiva and Blue Madeira. Michael Brinkmann was appointed CEO of Planasa in 2020. In 2021, Planasa entered the blackberry breeding and marketing sector with Black Sultana.

During 2021/22, new strawberry varieties RedSayra and Demoiselle, as well as Pink Hudson, a raspberry variety, were brought to the market. Also in 2022 Planasa legally constituted Planasa South Africa, to expand the cultivation of its blueberry varieties in the main growing countries in Southern Africa.

One year later, in 2023, Planasa acquired 100% of its subsidiary in China. And in 2024 100% of Hansabred, in German, thus expanding its northern strawberry variety portfolio.

In 2023 the EW Group purchased 100% of the company.

== Operations ==
Planasa business lines include: research and development, nurseries and fresh produce. It is a global breeding company and the world’s largest nurseries for strawberries, raspberries, blueberries, and asparagus, as well as for garlic seeds with more than 1,500 hectares of plant production in Spain, Poland, Morocco, Romania, China, Peru, USA and Mexico. Planasa produces around 1,000 million plants annually, tailored to diverse climates and ensuring sustainability and productivity.

=== Services ===
1. Breeding (R&D): The company's activities focus on breeding new berry varieties. To date, Planasa has registered over 225 varieties worldwide – including strawberries, blueberries, raspberries, blackberries, garlic and asparagus and offers access to them through its nurseries, thus ensuring the supply of plants to growers around the world.
2. Nurseries: Planasa specialises in production and marketing activities of plants and seeds. Customers around the world are supplied from 13 nurseries in eight countries.
3. Fresh Produce: Planasa produces and markets different produce, mainly endives and avocado.
4. Technical support: The Group's portfolio of services also includes technical support to growers, to ensure that the varieties deliver maximum performance.

=== Research & Development ===
The Planasa Group operates six research centres worldwide (Mexico, Spain, France, German, Netherlands, USA) and also maintains development centres to monitor and test new varieties in different climate zones at strategic locations. The results are protected by plant breeders' rights. According to Planasa, it has invested more than 25 million euros in research and development between 2018 and 2023.
