= Harold V. Biellier =

American poultry scientist

Harold V. Biellier (January 22, 1921 – March 31, 2011) was a noted poultry scientist from Missouri. He also served in the military for much of the 1940s and 1950s. In 1969, Bieller was made professor of poultry science at University of Missouri in Columbia, Missouri. He also was an assistant editor for Poultry Science for a decade. He studied methods to increase egg production, and one "Super Chicken" of his made into the Guinness Book of World Records for laying eggs for 448 consecutive days.

== Early life and education ==
He received the Bachelor of Science degree at the University of Missouri in 1943. He served in the United States Army and was stationed in Japan. He achieved the rank of captain. He studied Poultry Science at the University of Missouri.

== See also ==
- Poultry farming in the United States

== Bibliography ==
- Early Days with Daisy. Rural Beginnings, ISBN 1-4120-6278-0
