= Percy Samuel Lelean =

WWI surgeon, public health specialist

Portrait by Walter Stoneman, 1922

Colonel Percy Samuel Lelean CB CMG FRSE FRCS (21 July 1871 – 6 November 1956) was a Canadian-born surgeon who specialised in issues of Public Health. He served with distinction in the First World War.

== Life ==
He was born in Canada on 21 July 1871 the son of William Cox Lelean. He studied medicine at Hart House in Canada then sent to UK to St Mary's Hospital, London.

In the First Boer War, he volunteered for the Army Medical Services and saw action throughout South Africa, winning the Queen's Medal four times. Staying in Africa he served on the Anglo-French Boundary Commission in 1903, considering international boundaries from the River Niger to Lake Chad. He then served as an army surgeon in India until 1912.

He served as a Major in the Royal Army Medical Corps during the First World War. He was four times Mentioned in Dispatches. During the war he was also employed as a specialist at the Anti Gas Department in Millbank. He retired from the army at the rank of Colonel in 1922.

In 1926 he took the Usher Chair in Public Health at the University of Edinburgh. In 1926 he was elected a member of the Harveian Society of Edinburgh. In 1930 he was elected a Fellow of the Royal Society of Edinburgh. His proposers were Ralph Allan Sampson, James Hartley Ashworth, Sir Edward Albert Sharpey-Schafer and Sir William Wright Smith. In 1944 he retired fully and was succeeded by Prof Francis Albert Eley Crew.

He died in London on 6 November 1956.

== Publications ==
- Sanitation in War (1917)
- The Prevalence of Pellagra amongst Turkish Prisoners of War (1919)

== Family ==
In 1902 he married Mary Ellen Gillam of Stourbridge. They had two daughters.
