= Janet Scott Salmon Blyth =

Scottish geneticist

- Born: 19 February 1902; Flisk, East Fife, Scotland
- Died: 1972 (aged 70); Edinburgh, Scotland
- Education: University of Edinburgh

Janet Scott Salmon Blyth (19 February 1902 - 1972) was a Scottish geneticist who specialised in poultry genetics and husbandry in the interwar and post-war decades and played a prominent role in establishing the Poultry Research Centre, one of several institutions that would eventually be amalgamated to form the Roslin Institute.

== Early life and university ==
Janet Scott Salmon Blyth was born on the 19th February 1902 at Logie Farm in Flisk in East Fife to farmer James Blyth and his wife Janet McLaren Blyth (nee Osler). Growing up, she had two younger siblings, James and William, and a large complement of tenants, labourers, and their families for company at the Fife farm.

Blyth undertook her undergraduate degree at the University of Edinburgh from 1918 to 1921, gaining a BSc in Agricultural Sciences in 1921. She began her PhD at the same institution later that year, based at the university’s Department of Animal Breeding, then under the directorship of noted pioneering geneticist Francis Albert Eley Crew. She was awarded her doctorate in 1925 for her thesis researching the individual wool types and yield produced by the offspring of the Department’s ovine hybridisation programme.

Her early career research in this field, along with that of academic peers such as J.A. Fraser Roberts and F. Fraser Darling would impact ovine research globally for the next quarter of a century.

== Research career ==
In 1926, she was reported to have begun working “as an assistant to” Alan William Greenwood in poultry genetic research, under the supervision of Crew, who had been a keen poultry breeder since his youth. Greenwood only began his doctoral research in 1923, so the actual dynamic of their professional relationship at this stage in their careers requires further investigation.

In 1928, Blyth was a keynote speaker at the 5th meeting of the Royal Physical Society of Edinburgh chaired by zoologist Marion Newbigin, where she delivered an illustrated paper on her early research endeavours relating the gonadic structure of fowl to their comb-growth. In July 1930, Blyth and Greenwood presented to the World's Poultry Congress in London a joint paper on their ongoing work at the University of Edinburgh Animal Breeding Research Department titled “Some Experiments Relating to the Ovarian Function in the Fowl”. When Crew departed from Edinburgh on active service during World War Two, Greenwood became acting director of the University’s Institute of Animal Genetics, including its Poultry Section.

In 1946, Greenwood was invited by the Agricultural Research Council to expand the University’s research in the poultry field. In 1947 he was named the director of a newly established Poultry Research Centre. On taking up the new post in a new building, he was accompanied by Blyth, described in his obituary as his long-term “collaborator since 1923”. Between 1929-1951 the two would collaborate on at least 18 published journal articles or research papers.

In the 1952 Civil Service Year Book she is listed as one of the Centre’s two Principal Scientific Officers under Greenwood's leadership. As the research site received government funding, the history and output of the Poultry Research Centre is recounted in various Parliamentary Command Papers. By March 1960, Blyth is listed as one of five geneticists working there, the only woman on a team of 22 scientific and experimental research staff.

In 1966 Blyth's genetic research specialism was publicly listed as “Hybrid vigour and breeding". She remained an active teacher and researcher from the 1920s to the 1960s, her works would be cited in many papers and her assistance acknowledged by succeeding scholars in the field of animal genetics. She died in Edinburgh in 1972.

She published numerous papers under the names Janet Blyth, Janet S.S. Blyth, and, most notably, J.S.S. Blyth.

== Publications ==
- ‘On Fibres of “Intermediate” Character found in the Fleece of Ovis Vignei” by Crew, F.A.B., and Blyth, J.S.S., in Annals of Applied Biology (1923), vol.10 (3-4), pp295–300
- “Micrological analysis of two fleeces from Blackface Sheep.” By Blyth, Janet S. S. in Annals of Applied Biology 10. 3-4 (1923): 301–311.
- “Studies on the fleece fibres of British breeds of sheep” PhD thesis by Janet Scott Salmon Blyth, 1925, University of Edinburgh
- ‘Thyroid Gland and Plumage in Chickens’ by Greenwood, A.W. and Blyth, J.S.S., in Nature, 1927, Vol 120 (3022) p. 476
- ‘An Experimental Analysis of the Plumage of the Brown Leghorn Fowl' in A.W. and Blyth, J.S.S., in Proceedings of the Royal Society of Edinburgh (1929), Vol. XLIX, Part IV, No. 25
- ‘The results of testicular transplantation in brown leghorn hens’ by Greenwood, A.W. and Blyth, J.S.S. in Proceedings of the Royal Society of London, 1930, Vol 106 (748), p. 198-202
- 'Some Experiments Relating to the Ovarian Function in the Fowl', by Greenwood, A.W. and Blyth, J.S.S. in Proceedings of the World's Poultry Congress (1930)
- ‘On Significant Modifications of Feather Type Induced by Injections of Female Sex Hormone (Oestrin) to Capons', by Greenwood, A.W. and Blyth, J.S.S. in The Veterinary Journal Vol. 87, No. 1 (1930)
- 'Thymus Extirpation in the Laying Hen' by Greenwood, A.W. and Blyth, J.S.S. in Proceedings of the Society for Experimental Biology and Medicine, Vol. 29 (1931)
- 'Reversal of the Secondary Sexual Characters in the Fowl: A Castrated Brown Leghorn Male Which Assumed Female Characters', Journal of Genetics, Vol. XXVI, No. 2 (October 1932)
- ‘Biological methods of diagnosing equine pregnancy II – the Capon Test” by Greenwood, A.W. and Blyth J.S.S. in Proceedings of the Royal Society of London, 1934, Vol 116 (798), p. 247-258
- 'Variation in Plumage Response of Brown Leghorn Capons to Oestrone: I. Intramuscular Injection and II. Intradermal Injection', by Greenwood, A.W. and Blyth J.S.S. in Proceedings of the Royal Society of London, 1935
- ‘On the Relation Between the Site of Injection of Adrosterone and the Comb Response in the Fowl’ by Greenwood, A.W. and Blyth, J.S.S., in Quarterly Journal of Experimental Physiology, 1935, Vol.25 (3), p. 267-277
- 'Quantitative Studies on the Response of the Capon's Comb to Androsterone' by Alan Greenwood, Janet Scott Salmon Blyth and Robert Kenneth Callow, Biochemical Journal, Vol. XXIX, No. 6 (1935)
- 'Sex Dimorphism in the Plumage of the Domestic Fowl', by Greenwood, A.W. and Blyth, J.S.S., in Journal of Genetics, Vol. XXXVI, No.1 (May 1938)
- 'The Influence of Testis on Sexual Plumage in the Domestic Fowl', by Greenwood, A.W. and Blyth, J.S.S., in Journal of Genetics, Vol. XXXVI, No.2 (September 1938)
- ‘Experimental Modification of the Accessory Sexual Apparatus in the Hen’ by Greenwood, Alan W., and Blyth, J.S.S., in Quarterly Journal of Experimental Physiology and Cognate Medical Sciences, 1938, Vol.28 (1), p. 61-69
- 'A Study of Fecundity in the Domestic Fowl: the Behaviour of Persistency in Individual Hens' by Alan Greenwood, Janet Blyth and Nancy Galpin, Journal of Agricultural Science, Vol. XXX, Part II (April 1940);
- 'Henny-Feathering in Brown Leghorn Males' by Greenwood, A.W. and Blyth, J.S.S., in Journal of Endrocrinology, (1940–41)
- ‘Some Effects of Thyroid and Gonadotrophic Preparations in the Fowl’ by Greenwood, Alan W. and Blyth, J.S.S., in Quarterly Journal of Experimental Physiology and Cognate Medical Sciences, 1942, Vol.31 (3), p. 175-185
- 'Sexual Maturity in Brown Leghorn', by Greenwood, A.W. and Blyth, J.S.S., in Poultry Science, Vol. XXV, No.6, (Nov 1946)
- 'Indications of the Heritable Nature of Non-Susceptibility to Rous Sarcoma in Fowls' by Alan Greenwood, Janet Blyth and J.G Carr, British Journal of Cancer, Vol. II (1948)
- 'The Problem of Pullet Mortality', by Greenwood, A.W. and Blyth, J.S.S., in Official Report of the Eighth World Poultry Congress (August 1948)
- ‘A Repeated Cross Between Inbred Lines of Poultry’ by Greenwood, Alan W. and Blyth J.S.S. in The Journal of Agricultural Science, 1951, Vol.41 (4), p. 367-370
- 'Genetic and Somatic Aberrations in Two Asymmetrically Marked Fowls from Sex-Linked Crosses' by Greenwood, Alan W. and Blyth J.S.S. in The Journal of Agricultural Science, Vol. 41, Part 4 (June 1951)
- ‘Unilateral Defective Feathering in a Purebred Pullet’ by Blyth, J.S.S. and Hale, R.W. in The Journal of Heredity, 1953, Vol.44 (5), p. 181-183
- ‘The Mosaic Daughter of a Mosaic Cock’ by Blyth, J.S.S. in Poultry Science, Vol. 33, 2.1, (Mar 1954)
- ‘Notes on the Poultry Research Centre Flock of Brown Leghorns’ by Blyth, J.S.S. in World's Poultry Science Journal, Vol.10, (1954), Issue 2, p. 140-143
- ‘Egg Production, Longtime Trends in a Closed Line of Fowls by Blyth, J.S.S. in Proceedings of the Royal Society of Edinburgh: Biology, Vol. 65, 1955, pp.62-65
- ‘A correlation between egg albumen weight and shank width in inbred lines of Brown Leghorns’ by Blyth, J.S.S. in The Journal of Agricultural Science, 1955, 45(3), 293-297
- ‘Survey of line crosses in a Brown Leghorn flock 1. Egg Production’ by Blyth, J.S.S. and Sang, J.H. in Genetical Research, 1960. Vol.1 (3), p. 408-421
