= Frederick Hutt =

Canadian zoologist and geneticist

Prof Frederick Bruce Hutt HFRSE (29 August 1897 – 6 September 1991) was a Canadian zoologist and geneticist in the 20th century. His book Animal Genetics has 31 published editions from 1964 to 1981 and is translated into six languages.

He made extensive studies of salmonella in poultry.

== Life ==
He was born in Guelph, Ontario on 20 August 1897 into a farming family of Scots descent. He graduated with a BSA from the Agricultural College of Guelph in 1923. He then obtained an MSc in genetics at the University of Wisconsin in 1925 and an MA from the University of Manitoba in 1927 where he then became a lecturer in animal husbandry.

In 1929 the book Animal Genetics (1925) led Hutt to travel to Edinburgh in Scotland to work under its author, Prof Francis Albert Eley Crew. There he gained his first doctorate (PhD). In 1931 he returned to Canada to take up a professorship at the University of Minnesota as Professor of Poultry husbandry and Genetics, The following year, 1932, he became the youngest ever President of the Poultry Science Association.

In 1934 he moved to Cornell University to chair the Department of Animal Husbandry and from 1940 to 1944 also chaired the Department of Zoology. From 1944 to 1964 he was Professor of Animal Genetics. His students included Welford Lamoreaux, Randall Cole, Paul Sturkie, John Scholes, Robert F Ball, Clyde Mueller and Benjamin Rasmusen.

The University of Edinburgh awarded him an honorary doctorate (DSc) in 1939. In 1975 he was elected an Honorary Fellow of the Royal Society of Edinburgh.

He died on 6 September 1991, aged 93.

== Publications ==
- Genetics of the Fowl (1949)
- Genetic Resistance to Disease in Domestic Animals (1958)
- Prospects and Procedures for Breeding Better Poultry (1958)
- Animal Genetics (1964)
- Genetics for Dog Breeders (1979)

== Family ==
He had two sons, Robert Hutt and Bruce Hutt, and one daughter Margaret (now Mrs Margaret Neff).
