= ISA Brown =

Hybrid bird

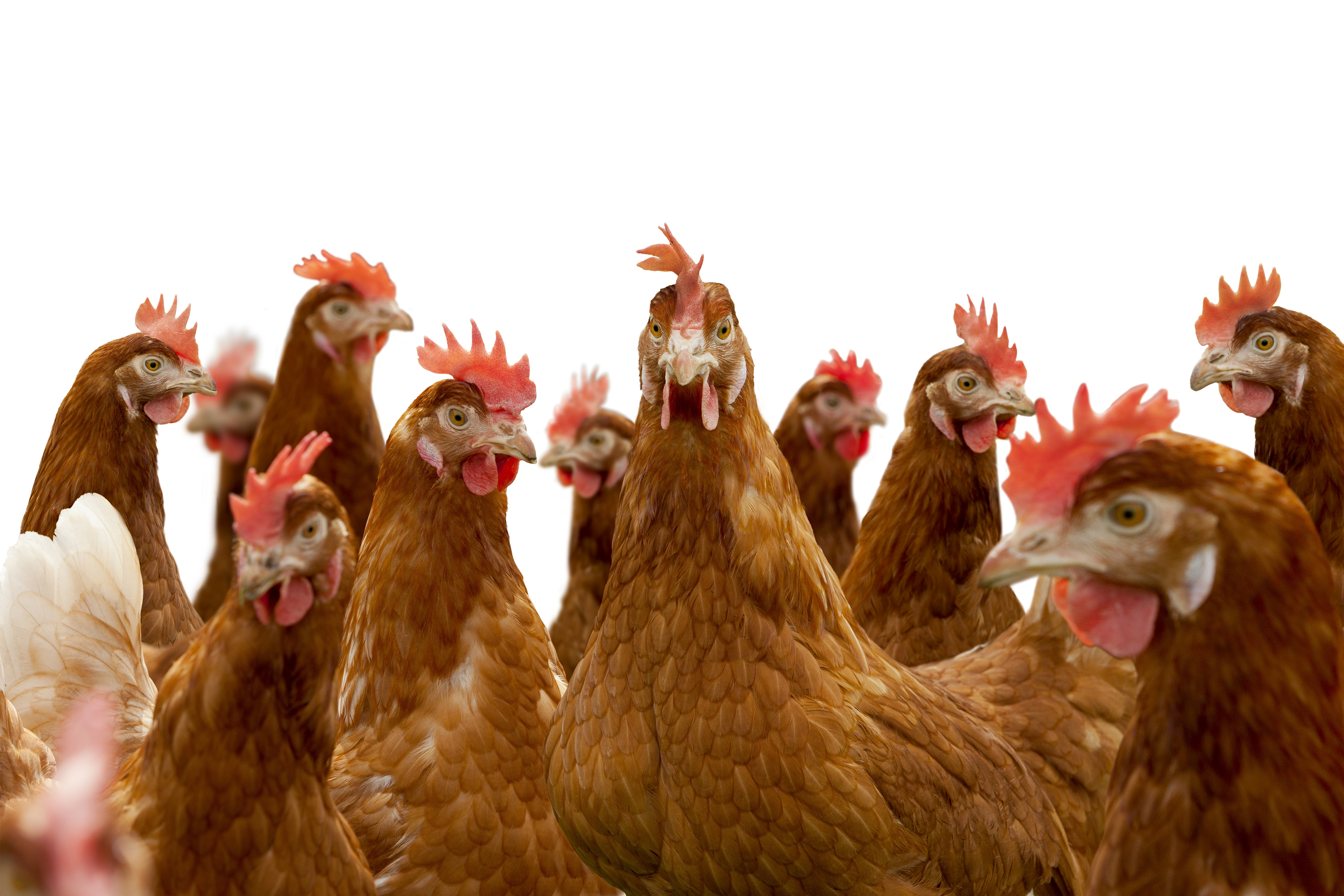
- Other names: Hubbard Brown, Brown, Red Sexlinks
- Country of origin: France
- Use: Egg layers

Traits
- Weight: Female: 2kg (4.40lb)
- Egg color: Brown
- Comb type: Single

Classification
- Chicken; Gallus gallus domesticus

The ISA Brown is a crossbreed of chicken, with sex-linked coloration. It is thought to have been the result of a complex series of crosses including but not limited to Rhode Island Reds and Rhode Island Whites, and contains genes from a wide range of breeds, the list of which is a closely guarded secret. It is known for its high egg production of approximately 300 eggs per hen in the first year of laying.

== History ==
ISA stands for Institut de Sélection Animale, the company which developed the crossbreed in 1978 for egg production as a battery hen. In 1997, the ISA Group merged with Merck & Co., forming Hubbard ISA, so the variety is sometimes called Hubbard Isa Brown. In 2005, Institut de Sélection Animale (ISA) and Hendrix Poultry Breeders (HPB) merged in ISA B.V., which also became part of the multi-species breeding company, Hendrix Genetics. In March 2005, Hubbard was purchased from Merial Ltd by Group Grimaud La Corbiere, SA.

== See also ==
- Hy-Line International
