= S. Sterling Munro Jr. =

American politician (1932–1992)

Sanford Sterling Munro Jr. (2 March 1932 – 9 March 1992) was an aide of former Washington Senator Henry M. Jackson best known for being one of the members of Richard Nixon's Enemies List.

== Life and career ==
He was born in Madison, Wisconsin, the son of the geneticist, Sanford Sterling Munro FRSE (1908–1971) and his wife, Dorothea Irene Spears. In 1944, the family moved to Bellingham, Washington, and Sterling attended High School here. After graduating High School he went to Washington, D.C. to attend evening classes at the university, whilst in the day taking on various Capitol Hill jobs, including aiding Congressman Jackson.

His career was interrupted when he was drafted to serve in the Korean War from 1951 to 1953. Upon discharge, he returned to Washington to join the legislative staff of Senator Henry Jackson.

Munro received a bachelor's degree in political science and journalism from George Washington University in 1957. In 1961, he became administrative assistant to Senator Jackson, at that time the youngest AA in the Senate.

During his career in politics, he was also administrator of the Bonneville Power Administration.

He retired from Washington in 1976 and moved to Wenatchee to work as a consultant.

Munro died in Seattle, Washington, of a heart attack.
