= Avian Diseases =

- Discipline: Veterinary medicine
- Language: English
- Edited by: Randall Singer

Publication details
- History: 1957–present
- Publisher: American Association of Avian Pathologists (United States)
- Frequency: Quarterly
- Impact factor: 1.3 (2012)

Standard abbreviations
- ISO 4: Avian Dis.

Indexing
- CODEN: AVDIAI
- ISSN: 0005-2086 (print); 1938-4351 (web)
- JSTOR: 00052086
- OCLC no.: 605197857

Links
- Journal homepage; Online archive

Avian Diseases is a quarterly peer-reviewed scientific journal publishing research on diseases of birds. It was established in 1957 and is published by the American Association of Avian Pathologists. The editor-in-chief is Randall Singer ( University of Minnesota). According to the Journal Citation Reports, the journal has a 2025 impact factor of 1.3.
