= Artificial daylight supplementation =

Use of artificial lighting in farming

Artificial daylight supplementation is the use of artificially generated lighting in the living areas of animals such as poultry, to extend the egg laying season of the birds. It is used commonly in commercial farms for chickens, ducks, and other birds, and the opposite, light deprivation, is used in most breeds of geese who have opposite laying seasons.

== History ==
The first recorded successful use of artificial lighting to increase egg production was in 1895, by Dr. E. C. Waldorf. It started to be used commercially in 1920.

It was commonly believed that the increase in daylight caused an increase in egg production because it allowed for more feeding time of the laying hens, although in 1939, it was discovered by two scientists, Burmester and Card, that as little as 6 hours of daylight was enough time to allow the poultry to feed.

== Use ==
Artificial light supplementation is used commonly in large commercial farms, to extend the laying season of the poultry. It is used commonly for chickens, ducks, geese, and other birds. It is meant to supplement the natural sunlight received by the birds that stimulates their egg production, during the shorter days of the year.

== Effects ==
Artificial light supplementation increases the egg production and extends the laying of some birds (such as chickens and ducks) because they rely on the changes in daylight hours - associated with season changes - to know when it is the proper time to lay their eggs. It is supplied to birds by shining a light - usually from a high pressure sodium, tungsten (incandescent), or fluorescent light bulb - into the living areas of the poultry, during some of the dark hours of the day. The orange and red lights (of approximately 590 - 750nm wavelengths) that are similar to those produced by the sun make the birds sexually active during the winter by stimulating their anterior lobe, located in the pituitary gland of the brain, causing the bird to produce a hormone that increases the activity of the bird's sex glands, increasing egg production.

Farms will usually try to match the amount of sunlight and artificial light that the birds get with the amount received from the sun on the longest day of the year

Some birds that only lay during the shorter days of the year require increased darkness during the summer months to maximize egg production, rather than increased lighting during the winter.

=== Effects on egg hatchability ===
It is possible that the hatchability of eggs laid during the use of artificial lighting is decreased, although consensus has not been reached on this issue.
