= Buckeye chicken =

American breed of chicken

Buckeye
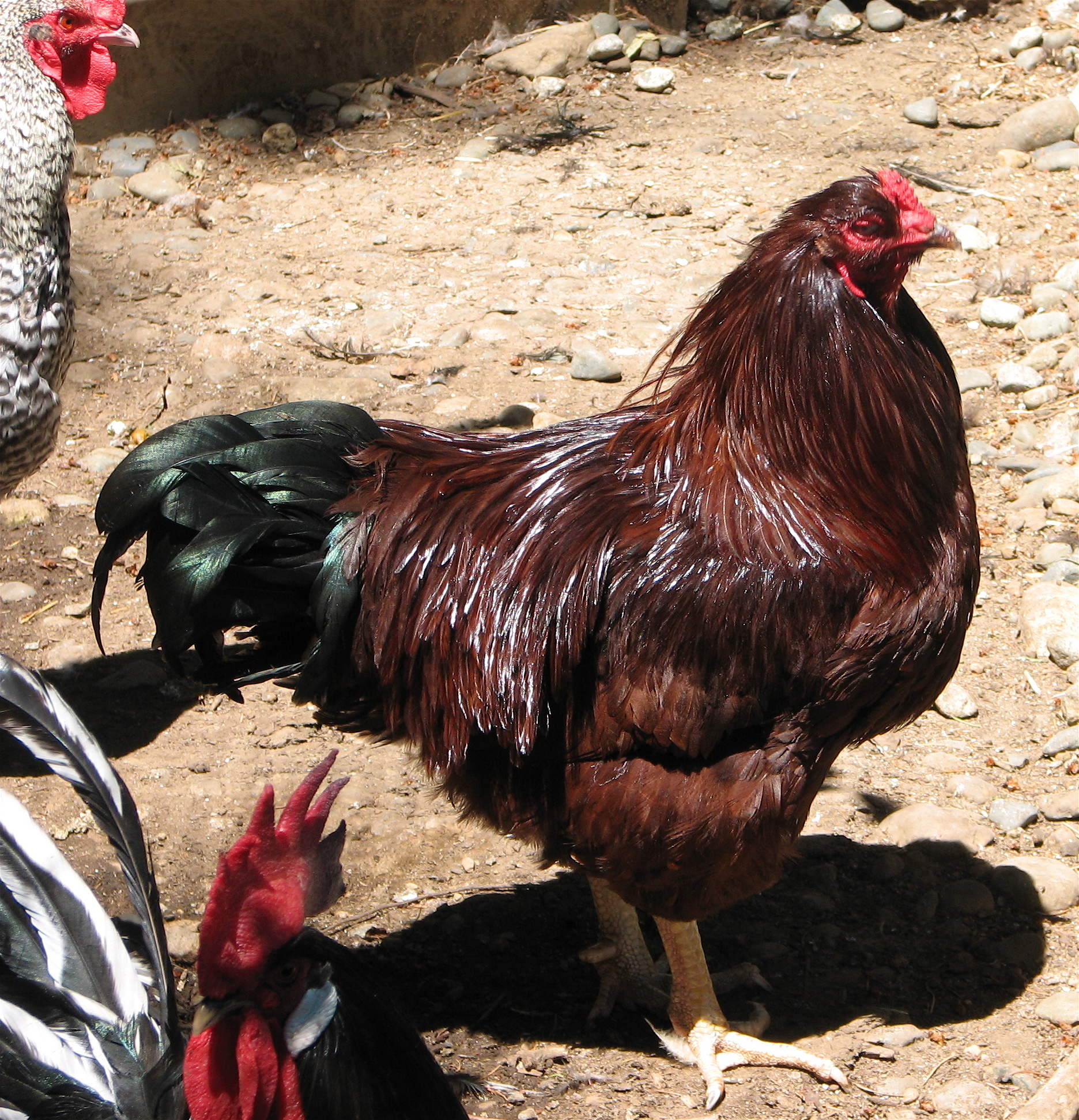
- Rooster in British Columbia
- Conservation status: FAO (2007): critical; Livestock Conservancy (2022): threatened
- Country of origin: United States

Traits
- Weight: Male: 9 lb (4 kg); Female: 6.5 lb (3 kg)

Classification
- APA: American
- PCGB: Rare soft feather: heavy

The Buckeye is an American breed of chicken. It was created in Ohio in the late nineteenth century by Nettie Metcalf. The color of its plumage was intended to resemble the color of the seeds of Aesculus glabra, the Ohio Buckeye tree for which the state is called the 'Buckeye State'.

It is a dual-purpose chicken, kept for both meat and eggs. It is yellow-skinned, and the eggs are brown. It is the only breed in the American Class to have a pea comb.

== History ==
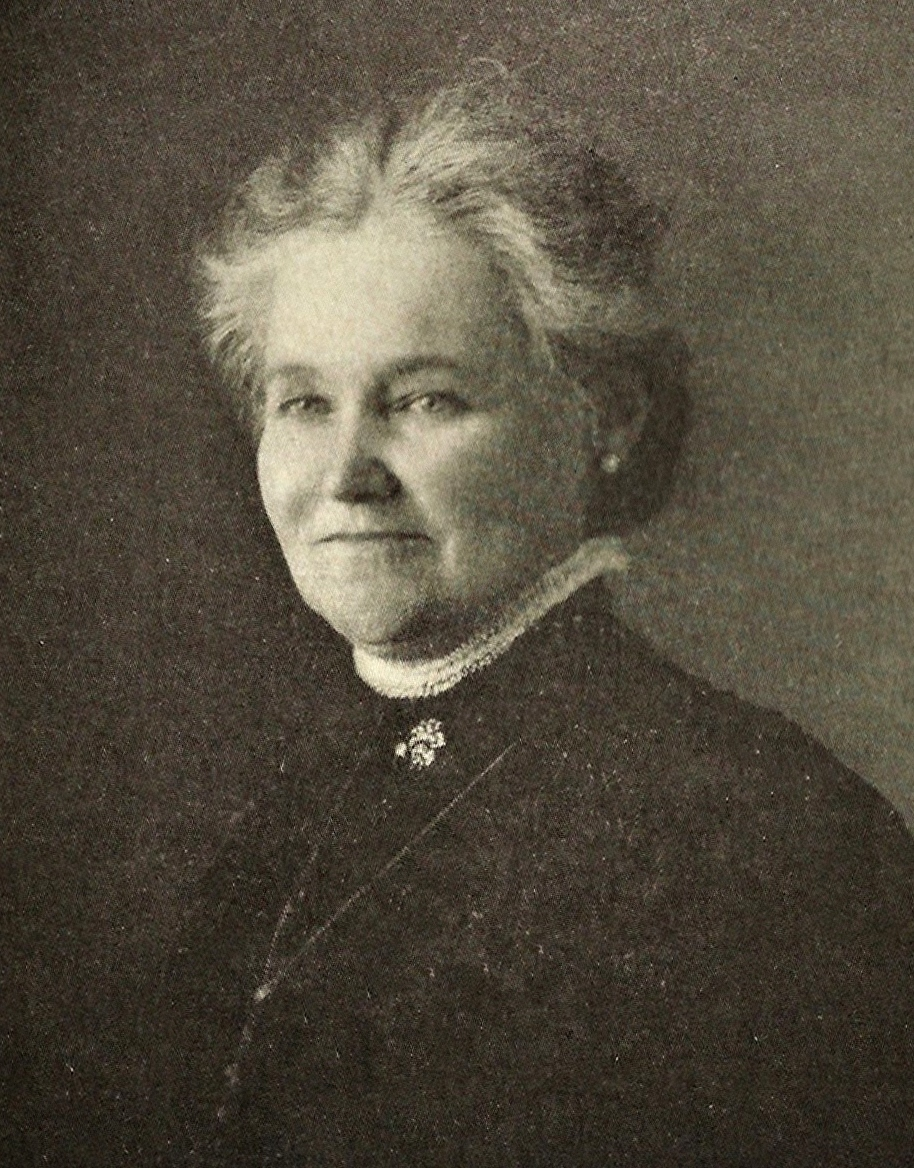
Nettie Metcalf, who created the breed in 1896

The Buckeye was first bred and developed in 1896, by Nettie Metcalf, a resident of Warren, Ohio. It is the only American breed of chicken known to have been developed by a woman, although women customarily were in charge of the household poultry flock on farms and in households throughout much of U.S. history. Metcalf crossbred Barred Plymouth Rocks, Buff Cochins, and some black-breasted red games to produce the Buckeye. Her goal was a functional breed that could produce well in the bitter Midwest winters. Contrary to popular belief, the Buckeye breed was created before the Rhode Island Red breed. Metcalf sent birds to the RIR breeders in order for them to improve their breed.

The Buckeye was admitted in 1904 to the American Poultry Association's Standard of Perfection. This acceptance signifies official certification as a breed by the Association, allowing Buckeyes to be entered into poultry shows and judged according to the breed standard (as outlined in the Standard of Perfection).

The recognition of Buckeyes in the Standard has been a significant factor in its survival. In the past, largely due its lack of color variations, the Buckeye has not been an especially popular exhibition breed. Since the late 20th century, there has been growing interest in the exhibition poultry fancy for this dual-purpose variety of bird. The Buckeye has generally been a bird of smaller farm flocks, rather than major commercial operations.

Today the breed status is listed as watch by the American Livestock Breeds Conservancy, watch being defined as: Fewer than 5,000 breeding birds in the United States, with ten or fewer primary breeding flocks, and estimated global population less than 10,000. The breed is included in the Slow Food USA Ark of Taste, a catalog of heritage foods in danger of extinction.

== Characteristics ==
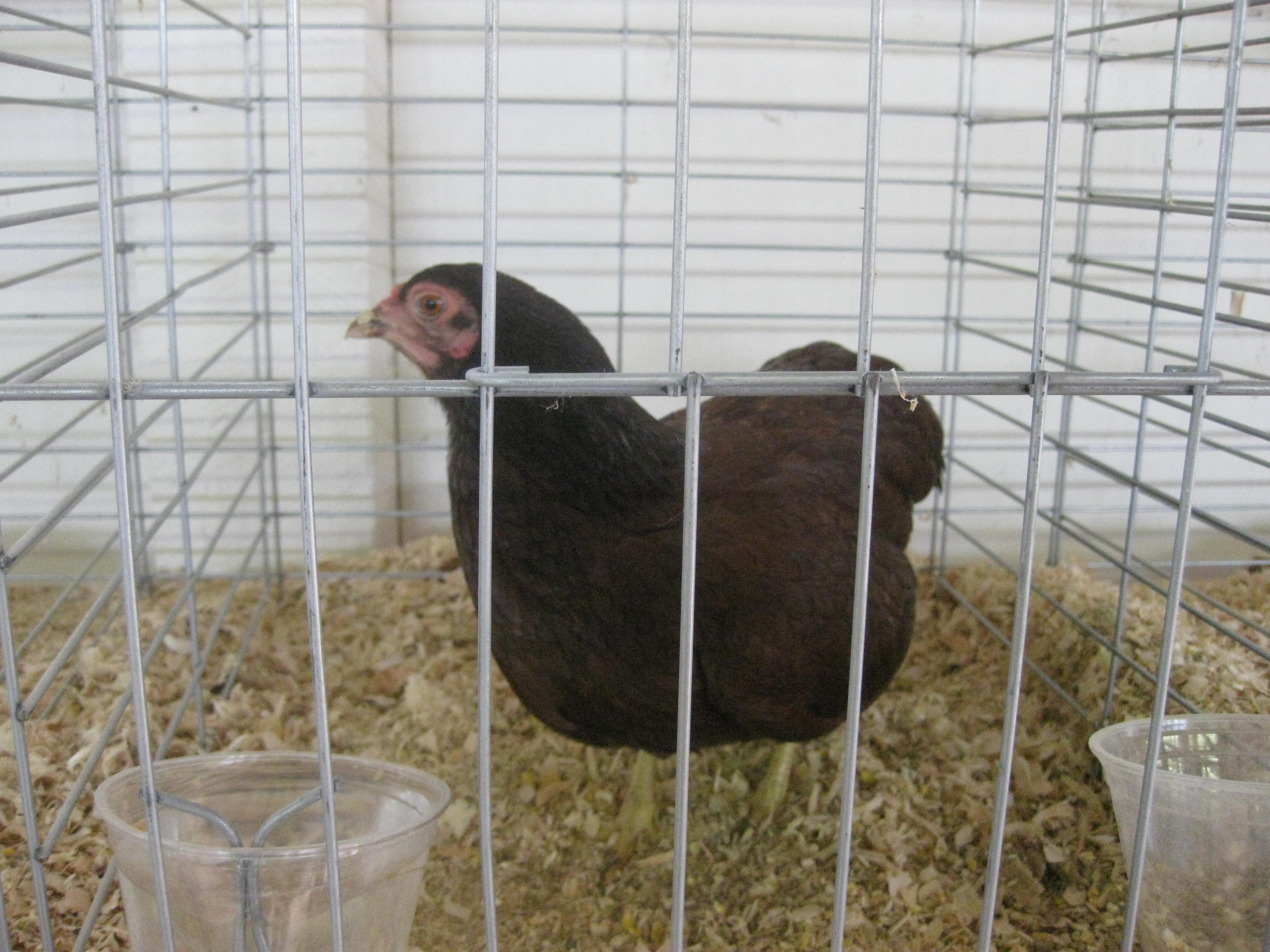
A bantam Buckeye hen

The Buckeye male weighs an average of 9 lb (4 kg), and the hen 6.5 lb (3 kg). The breed has yellow skin and lays brown eggs. Its primary color is a mahogany red with black tails; sometimes males have other dark feathering. According to the breed standard, a Buckeye's plumage should ideally resemble the hue of an Ohio Buckeye's seeds. Especially in the hen, the breed is very similar in appearance to the Rhode Island Red. The Buckeye can be differentiated by a bar of slate color on the back feathers close to the body; the body is also much more compact, with a short yet broad back.

The Buckeye is the only purely American breed to sport a pea comb, and this, combined with its stocky build, makes it a supremely cold hardy chicken. Other breeds of fowl developed in the U.S. (such as the Ameraucana) may sport pea combs, but these chickens were bred primarily from foreign birds. It bears some traits of Game fowl in frame and disposition, being assertive in character and a very good forager. Generally calm, the cock birds in rare cases may become aggressive. Despite its game heritage, it tolerates confinement well, although it will be much happier and produce better if allowed to range on grass. The Buckeye is said by breeders to be disinclined towards feather picking even in confinement, and to make prolific hunters of mice and other pests. A good meat producer and layer of between 150 and 200 eggs per year, the Buckeye is a dual-purpose chicken well-suited to small farmyard and backyard flocks.
