= Nettie Metcalf =

American farmer (1859–1945)

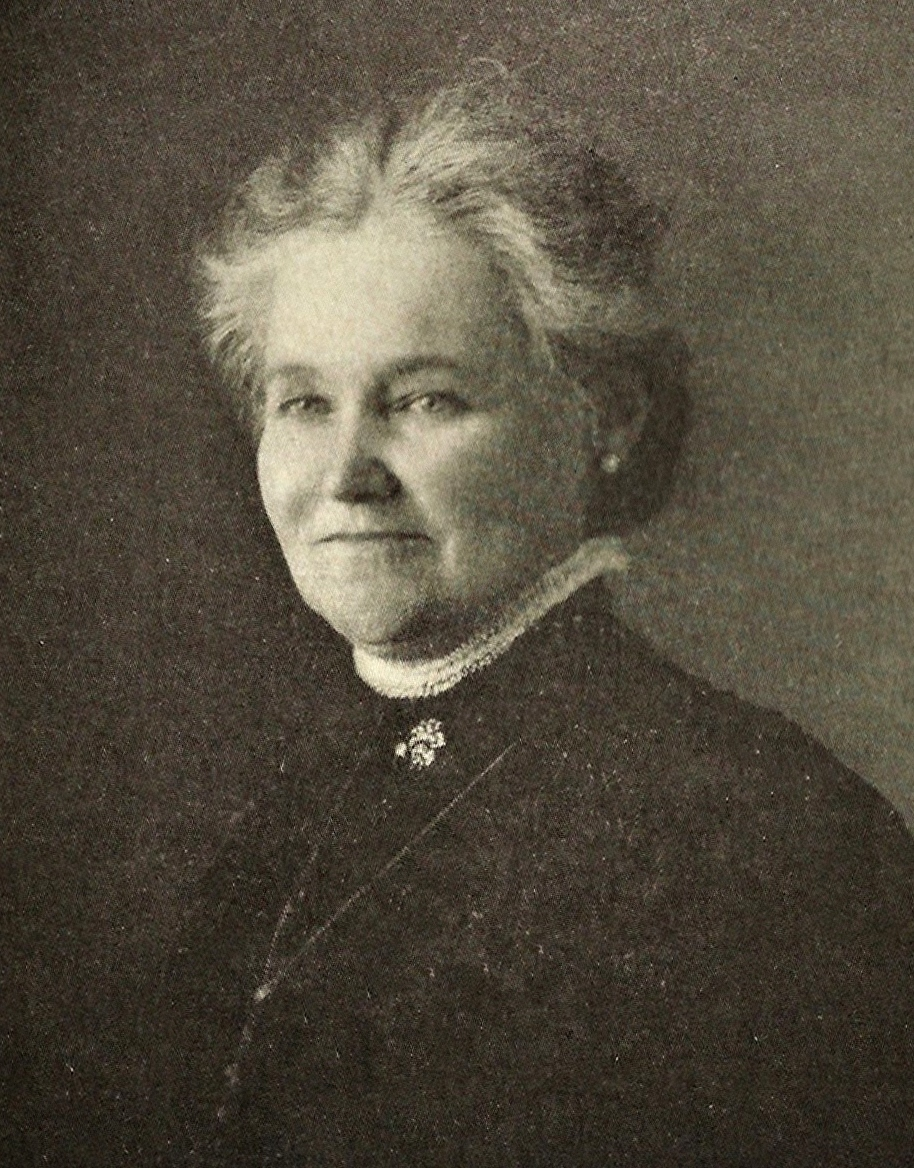
- Metcalf c. 1910s
- Born: Nettie Williams; October 13, 1859; Warren, Ohio, U.S.
- Died: 1945 (aged 85–86)
- Known for: Breeding buckeye chickens; President of American Buckeye Club

Nettie Metcalf (née Williams; October 13, 1859 – 1945) was an American farmer from Warren, Ohio. She is best known for creating the Buckeye chicken breed, which was officiated by the American Poultry Association in February 1905. Metcalf attended poultry meetings across North America and became President of the American Buckeye Club. She is the only woman recorded by the American Poultry Association to create a chicken breed.

== Personal life ==
Nettie Williams was born in Warren, Ohio in 1859. She was a descendant of William Williams, a Connecticut politician and Founding Father who signed the Declaration of Independence.

On March 6, 1879, she married Francis "Frank" C. Metcalf. They had three children.

Metcalf may have experienced occupational burnout as a result of the high demands for Buckeyes, leading to her move from Ohio to California. In 1917, she explained:

The demand created for this breed caused me, the originator, such strenuous work that I gave all my time to chickens entirely and tried to supply the demand for the Buckeyes until my health was breaking down...

By 1917, she had moved to California with her husband. Her husband died on November 17, 1929.

== Buckeye chickens ==
Metcalf created the Buckeye chicken breed in the 1890s, which she first named "Buckeye Reds." She described them as having "a modified Cornish shape, with the very darkest of red plumage."

Her goal was to create a practical breed that was able to survive harsh Ohio winters.

=== Creation of breed ===
In 1879, she began housekeeping with a flock of Brown Leghorn chickens. However, she was dissatisfied with their temperament, stating they "scratched and destroyed more than their necks were worth, laid only in the spring, and hid their nests then in the most out-of-the-way places they could find." When Metcalf would suggest slaughtering them, her husband would claim it was the wrong time of year, because according to Metcalf, "they were always scrawny and in poor condition."

After reading poultry literature, she tried domesticating Black Langshans and Plymouth Barred Rocks for a profit. She then mixed the Barred Rocks with Buff Cochins to produce what she called "a big, lazy fowl." Afterwards, she bought eggs from a breeder of B. B. Red Games, later speculating that his chickens were not purebred and mixed with Indian Game. That year's mating produced red birds, which were new to Ohio. She tried to reproduce the red birds and was "laughed at" presumably by neighbors for the attempt, but "determined to 'show folks' or die trying." She worked in a 9 foot by 12 foot coop in her 100-acre farm.

While attempting to replicate the red birds, Metcalf was concerned with the negative effects of inbreeding, and her surmises were proven correct when the four progenitors produced an irregular flock with "Green legs and feathered legs, buff chicks, black chicks, and even red and black barred chicks; single combs and pea combs, and no combs at all, but fighters from away back."

Metcalf's neighbors were amused by the flock, but she claimed one neighbor "quit laughing and decided to help me out." However, the neighbor's husband, Van, "didn't want any of those Metcalf mongrels on the place."

The neighbor's husband, Van, put a Barred Rock rooster on one side of a high fence and the buckeye game on the other and went in for tea and supper. When the neighbor expressed concern, her husband replied, "Let them fight; my big rooster will soon knock the spots off that little scamp." However, later in the day, they found the Barred Rock rooster dead with his eyes gouged out and the Buckeye on top. Van said, "Well, I swan" (a euphemism for "I swear"). Van went on to become a breeder of buckeyes.

=== Rhode Island Reds ===
In the winter of 1896, Metcalf learned of the existence of Rhode Island Reds, which were bred during the second half of the 19th century. Realizing other farmers had also attempted to breed red chickens, Metcalf exchanged birds and eggs with East Coast breeders to discover that the Buckeyes were a darker mahogany color, and Buckeyes had single and pea combs as opposed to rose and single combs.

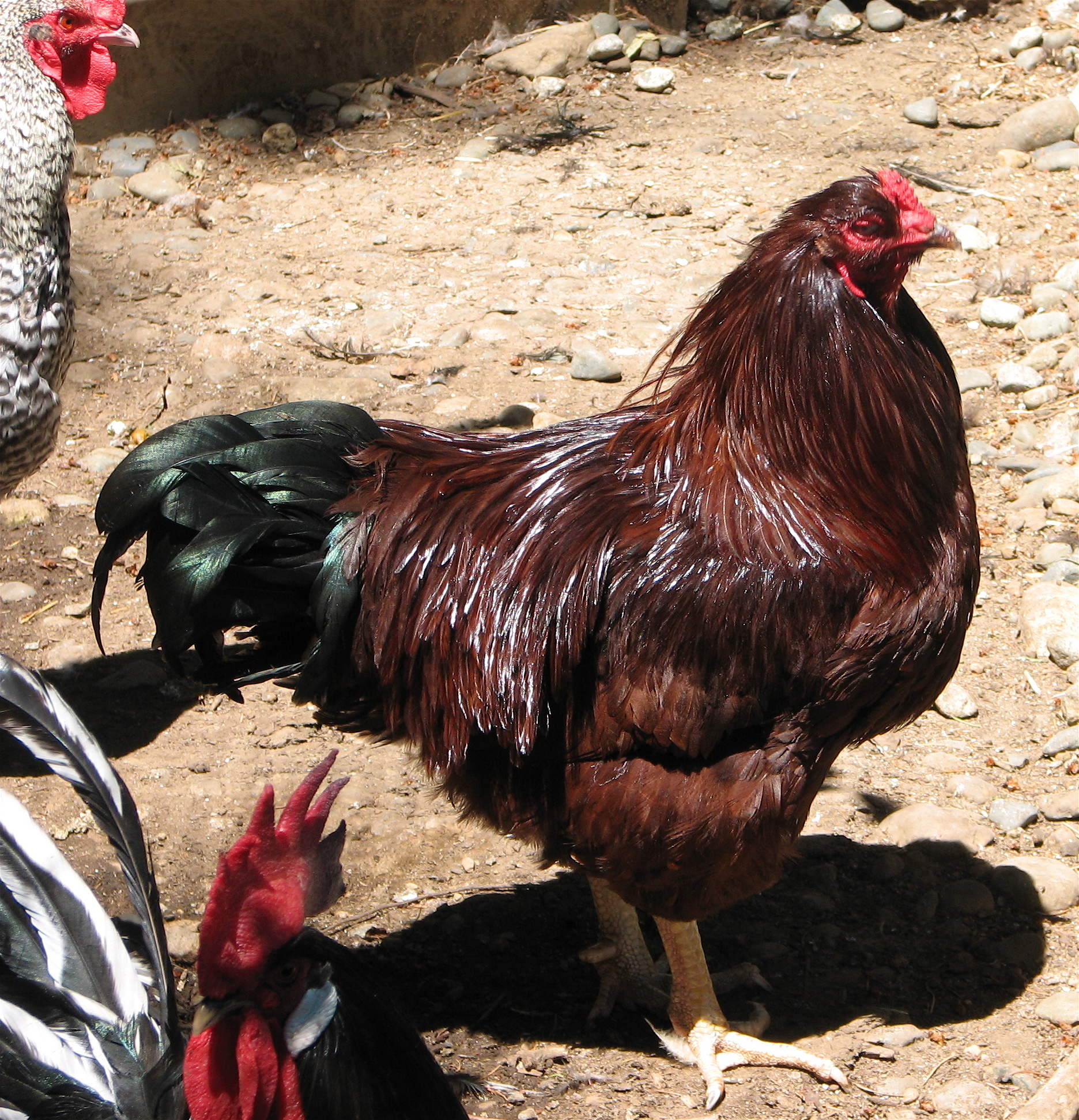
Metcalf created the Buckeye breed in Warren, Ohio

=== Officiating breed ===
In 1902, Metcalf exhibited her breed at a poultry show in Cleveland, Ohio. On August 24, 1903, the president and secretary of the American Poultry Association inspected the buckeye breed and advised Metcalf to continue breeding them, as it was a distinct breed from Rhode Island Reds.

In 1904, she and her husband displayed the chickens at a poultry show in Rochester, New York. Buckeyes were admitted as an American Poultry Association breed in February 1905.

In 1907, she attended the American Poultry Association's first mid-summer meeting in Niagara Falls, which involved sending telegrams to other members. The 1908 APA revision committee advised that Buckeye should be dropped from the standard, but this was voted down in Niagara, New York in 1909.

== Legacy ==
In 1909, the American Buckeye Club was established to preserve the Buckeye breed. As of 2024, the website of the organization is accessible.

The 2001 Encyclopedia of Historic and Endangered Livestock and Poultry Breeds mentions Nettie Metcalf and claims she created Buckeyes by crossing Cornish Games, Brahmas, and Black Breasted Gamefowl.

In the early 21st century, the Shumaker Farm Buckeye Chickens website compiled images relevant to Nettie Metcalf's life and work.

In 2003, the Buckeye breed became endangered, with less than 72 breeding birds on record. In 2005, the American Livestock Breeds Conservancy began a program to restore the breed as backyard birds.

In 2013, Nettie Metcalf's life and chicken breed was the episode topic of agriculture podcast The Urban Chicken.

== See also ==
- Caroline Rose Foster, contemporary woman farmer in New Jersey
- Rosella Rice, contemporary Ohioan writer
- Chicken breeds recognized by the American Poultry Association
- Buckeye chicken
