= Janet Scott (scientist) =

South African chemist (1964–2022)

Janet Lesley Scott
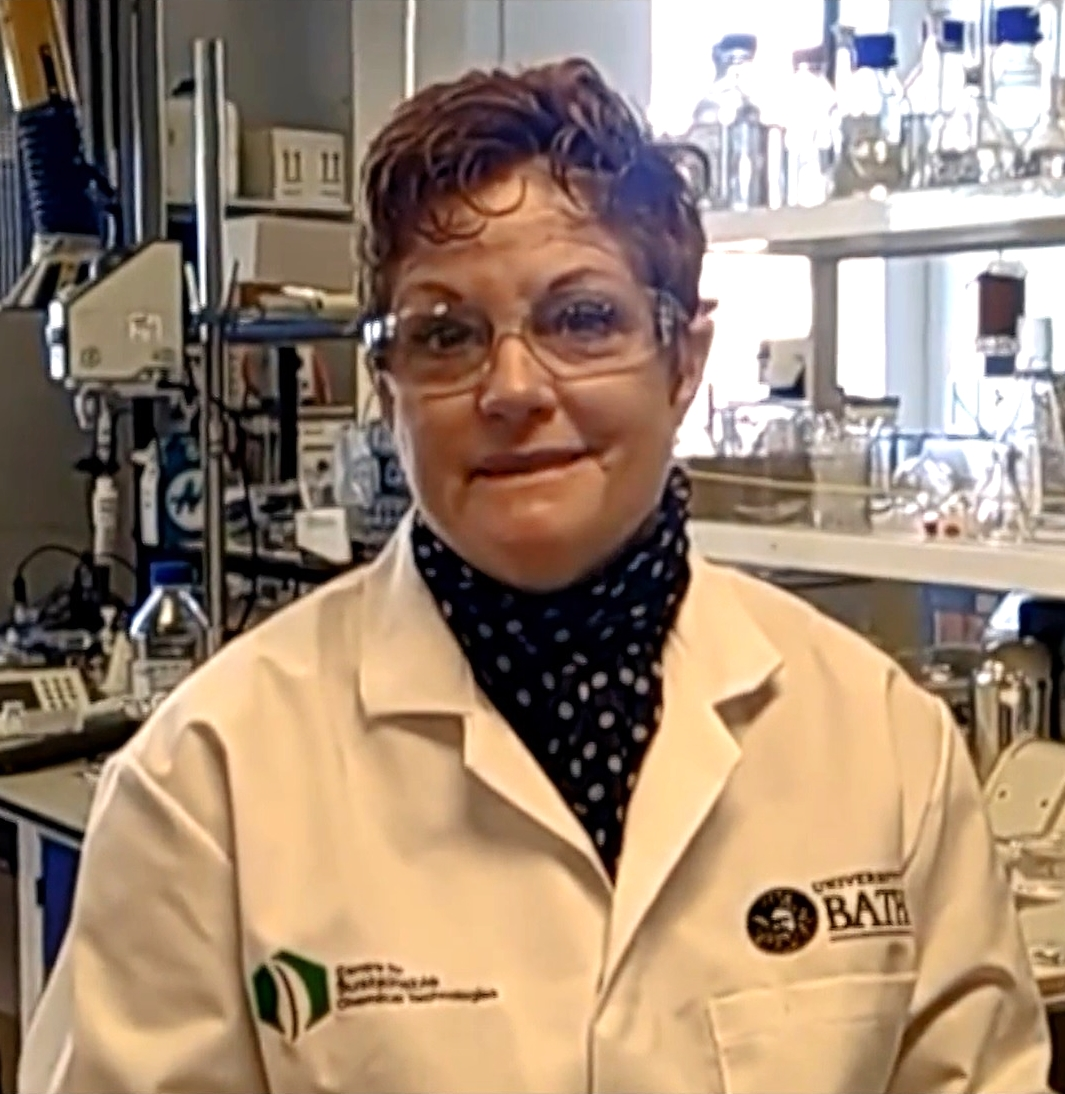
- Scott speaks about her work at the University of Bath in 2017
- Born: 1964; South Africa
- Died: 23 January 2022 (aged 57–58)
- Education: University of Cape Town; University of Natal
- Scientific career
- Workplaces: University of Bath; Unilever; Monash University; University of Cape Town; Fine Chemicals Corporation
- Thesis: Inclusion compounds of cholic acid and methyl cholate (1995)

Janet L. Scott (April 1964 – 23 January 2022) was a South African chemist who was Professor of Sustainable Chemistry at the University of Bath. She also worked as the Director of the Engineering and Physical Sciences Research Council Centre for Doctoral Training in Sustainable Chemical Technologies.

== Early life and education ==
Scott was from South Africa. She studied chemistry and applied chemistry at the University of Natal. She moved to the University of Cape Town as a graduate student, where she earned a master's degree and a doctorate. Her doctoral research considered cholic acid and methyl cholate.

== Research and career ==
Scott joined the faculty at the University of Cape Town in 1992, where she worked until completing her doctorate in 1995. She joined the Fine Chemicals Corporation in South Africa in 1996. Scott moved to Monash University in 2000, where she worked as deputy director of the Australian Research Council Centre for Green Chemistry. In 2006 she was appointed a Senior Marie Curie Fellow at Unilever.

In 2010, Scott joined the Department of Chemistry at the University of Bath. Her research considered renewable raw materials for the development of sustainable products. In 2011, she developed a biodegradable microbead that could be used to replace dangerous plastic microbeads. She was particularly interested in making microbeads from cellulose, an abundant natural material that does not derive from fossil fuels. For several years she developed a reliable, scalable strategy to generate cellulose microbeads. She was made Reader in Sustainable Chemistry in 2016 and a Professor two years later. Scott launched Naturbeads, a spin off company for cellulose microbead generation, in 2018. Naturbeads was supported by Innovate UK and Sky Ocean Ventures.

== Awards and honours ==
- 2004 Fellow of the Royal Society of Chemistry
- Royal Australian Chemical Society Green Chemistry Prize

== Selected publications ==
- Shahana Chowdhury; Ram S. Mohan; Janet L. Scott (March 2007). "Reactivity of ionic liquids". Tetrahedron. 63 (11): 2363–2389. doi:10.1016/j.tet.2006.11.001. ISSN 0040-4020. Wikidata Q61910116.
- Cave GW; Raston CL; Janet L Scott (1 November 2001). "Recent advances in solventless organic reactions: towards benign synthesis with remarkable versatility". ChemComm (21): 2159–2169. doi:10.1039/b106677n. ISSN 1364-548X. PMID 12240095. Wikidata Q47316339.
- Gadi Rothenberg; A P Downie; C L Raston; Janet L Scott (1 September 2001). "Understanding solid/solid organic reactions". Journal of the American Chemical Society. 123 (36): 8701–8708. doi:10.1021/ja0034388. ISSN 0002-7863. PMID 11535074. Wikidata Q43727550.

=== Books ===
- Chemical processes for a sustainable future. T. M. Letcher, Janet L. Scott, Darrell A. Patterson. Cambridge, UK. 2015. ISBN 978-1-84973-975-7. OCLC 905084916.
- Materials for a sustainable future. T. M. Letcher, Janet L. Scott. Cambridge, UK: RSC Pub. 2012. ISBN 978-1-84973-407-3. OCLC 794035940.

== Personal life ==
Scott left the University of Bath in 2020 due to ill health. She died in January 2022.
