= Alan William Greenwood =

Scottish zoologist and geneticist

Alan William Greenwood CBE FRSE
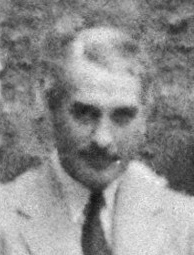
- Born: 29 June 1897; Melbourne, Australia
- Died: 4 May 1981 (aged 83); Edinburgh, Scotland
- Education: University of Melbourne; University of Edinburgh
- Occupations: zoologist and geneticist

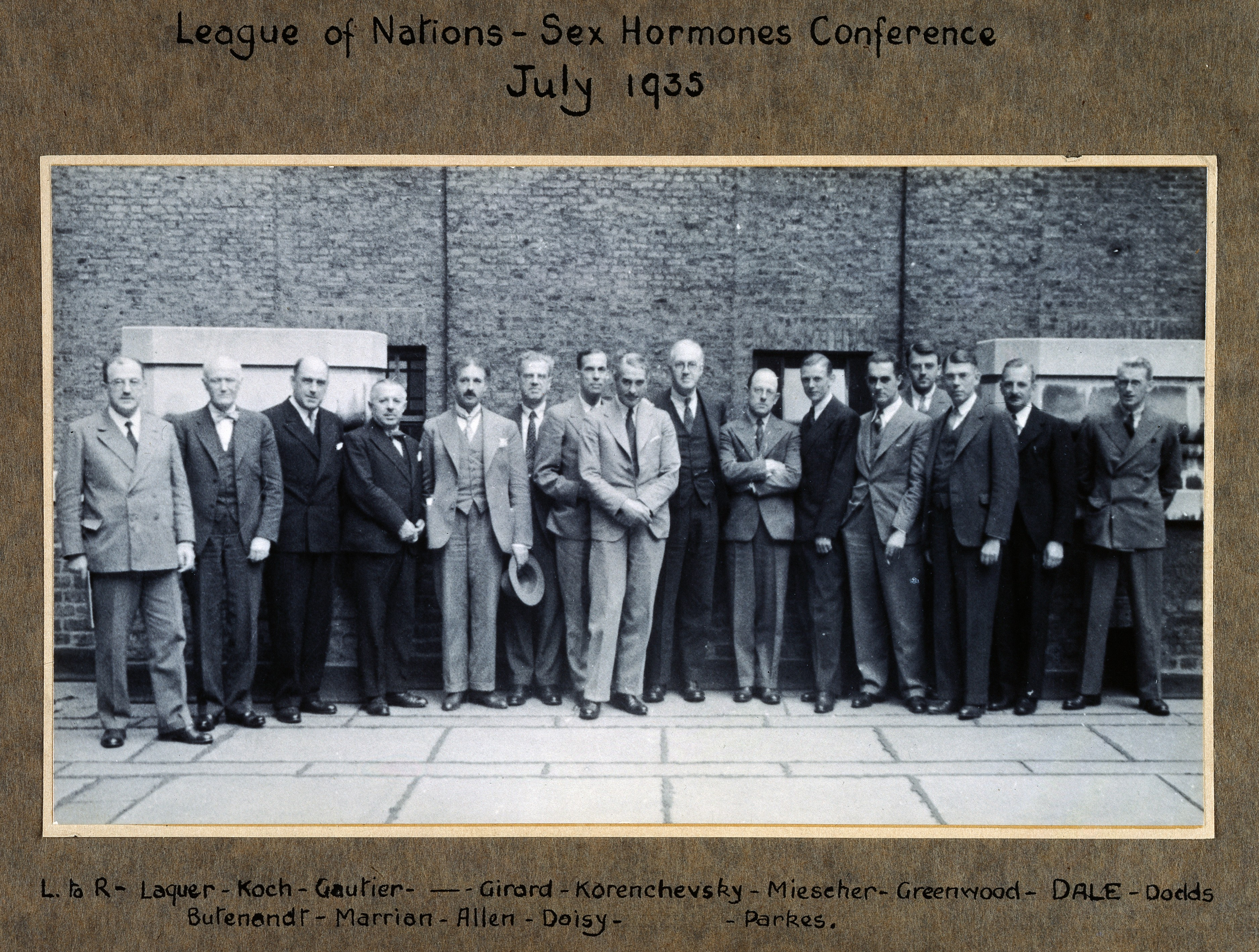
Members of the Second International Congress on Sex Hormones, July 1935 (Greenwood centre in a pale suit)

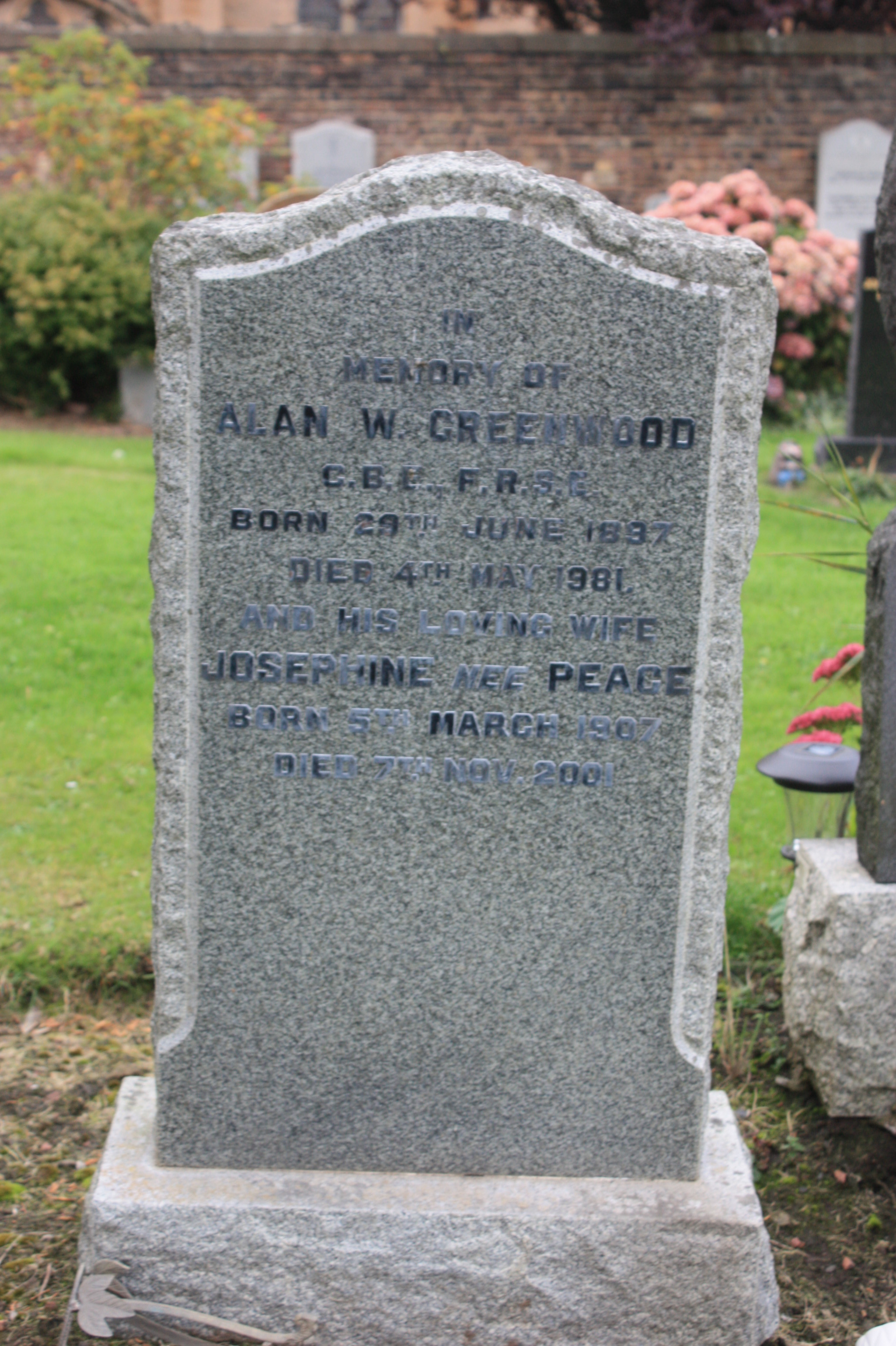
The grave of Alan William Greenwood, Grange Cemetery, Edinburgh

Alan William Greenwood CBE FRSE (29 June 1897 – 4 May 1981) was an Australian zoologist and geneticist, who helped pave the way to creating Dolly the Sheep. He served as director of the Poultry Research Centre from 1947 until 1962.

== Life ==
He was born in Melbourne in Australia on 29 June 1897 and attended Wesley College in Melbourne. He then won a place at Melbourne University graduating BSc in Chemistry and Biology in 1920. He continued as a postgraduate, gaining an MSc in 1923 then travelling to Scotland to study for a PhD at the University of Edinburgh under the supervision of James Cossar Ewart. Here he also began work at the Animal Breeding Research Department (later renamed to the Institute of Animal Genetics). His colleagues included the geneticist Janet Scott Salmon Blyth, with whom he would go on to collaborate with for many years, and the pharmacist John Michael Robson who joined the institute in 1929.

He gained his PhD from the University of Edinburgh in 1925, and in 1931 received a further honorary DSc from the University of Melbourne. Around 1935 he was joined at the institute by Sanford Sterling Munro.

In 1927 he was elected a Fellow of the Royal Society of Edinburgh, his proposers including James Hartley Ashworth, James Cossar Ewart and Sir Robert Blyth Greig. In 1932 he was awarded the Keith Medal for his contributions to the study of the biology of fowl. He served as vice president of the society from 1943 to 1946 and secretary 1955 to 1960.

In the Second World War he served as acting director while the former director, Francis Albert Eley Crew FRSE, served in the war, and in 1947 he fully replaced him as director alongside Prof James Edward Nichols. The overall speciality was in poultry research, especially chicken reproduction.

In the New Years Honours list on 1 January 1955 he was made a Commander of the Order of the British Empire. He died at 64 Strathearn Road in Edinburgh on 4 May 1981 and was buried at Grange Cemetery. His simple gravestone lies in the modern northern section of the west extension. The Roslin Institute's avian facility is named in his honour.

== War Service ==
Greenwood served in the Camel Field Ambulance (part of the Australian Imperial Forces) in Palestine in the First World War.

== Family ==
He married twice: firstly to Vera Crockett in 1923; secondly to Josephine Peace (1907–2001). He had no children by either marriage.
