= EW Group =

German company in the agribusiness

- Company type: GmbH
- Industry: Food Industry, Life Sciences, Genetics, Diagnostics
- Founded: 1999
- Founder: Erich Wesjohann
- Headquarters: Visbek, Germany
- Revenue: €3.97 billion (2021)
- Number of employees: 17.467 (07/2022)
- Website: ew-group.de

The EW Group GmbH (also known as the Erich Wesjohann Group), headquartered in Visbek, Germany, is a global family owned holding, which integrates more than 300 active subsidiaries. The company is operating primarily at the beginning of the value chain, including animal and plant breeding, animal health and diagnostics. The management board comprises the founder, Erich Wesjohann, his sons, Dirk and Jan Wesjohann, as well as Albert Cordts.

== History ==
=== Origin ===
The origins of the EW Group can be traced back to the "Lohmann-Wesjohann Group," which included companies operating in breeding, animal feed and pharmaceuticals and was managed by Paul Wesjohann and Heinz Lohmann. Paul Wesjohann's two sons, Paul-Heinz and Erich Wesjohann, were also active within the business. In 1997, both brothers acquired full ownership of the company shares.

In 1998, the group was split up. This resulted in the current EW Group (Erich Wesjohann Group) and the PHW Group (Paul-Heinz Wesjohann Group), in 1999. As part of the split, Erich Wesjohann took over the poultry breeding, mushroom breeding and grain trading sectors, while Paul-Heinz Wesjohann assumed control of the slaughtering operations as well as the animal nutrition and pharmaceutical divisions.

In 2006, Erich Wesjohann renamed the group from Erich Wesjohann GmbH & Co. KG to EW Group GmbH.

=== Since 2005: Expansion in Poultry and Layer Breeding ===
In 2005, the EW Group acquired Aviagen (Aviagen International Group Inc.), the world leader in broiler breeding. In 2010, it was announced that the EW Group would acquire the "Peterson Male" broiler breeder genetic line from Peterson Farms in Decatur, USA. This was integrated into Aviagen, a subsidiary operating 500 locations worldwide and employing around 10,000 people. In 2006, Aviagen Turkeys was also acquired. This leading global turkey breeding company and the only player with independent breeding programs on two continents, was created from the merger of British United Turkeys (B.U.T.) and Nicholas Turkey Breeding Farms

Agri Advanced Technologies GmbH (AAT) was founded in 2015. The main field of activity of AAT is the development of specialized application technologies for poultry breeding and husbandry, for example machines for in ovo sex determination of layers, grading and vaccination devices for broiler breeders or technical solutions for feed and egg disinfection. In August 2017, the EW Group announced its acquisition of the broiler breeding company Hubbard Breeders from Groupe Grimaud, which was integrated into the Aviagen Group in 2018. In 2022, the EW Group acquired the French layer breeding company Novogen SAS and its Dutch distribution partner Verbeek.

=== Since 2008: Expansion in Fish Breeding ===
In 2008, the EW Group acquired a majority stake in AquaGen, an international salmon breeding company based in Norway. By August 2013, AquaGen became a 100% subsidiary of the EW Group. In 2017, the EW Group acquired GenoMar (Norway). AquaGen invested in Brazil in 2016 through the acquisition of farmer Aquabel and in 2020, AquaAmerica / AquaPorto (Brazil), both companies specialize in tilapia breeding.

== Activities ==
=== Overview ===
The EW Group's subsidiaries operate predominantly at the beginning of the value chain in key markets within the life sciences sector. This includes the basic breeding of animals and plants. Animal breeding accounts for 77% of the revenue, amounting to €3.08 billion. Additionally, the group develops and produces animal health, animal nutrition, diagnostics and agricultural trade. In the 2020/2021 fiscal year, the EW Group generated 36.5% of its revenue in Europe, 31.9% in North America, 11.7% in Asia, and 19.94% in other regions worldwide.

=== In Detail ===
The EW Group operates in various business sectors through its subsidiaries:

1. Broiler and Turkey Breeding: This segment includes the Aviagen group, the global leader in poultry breeding for broiler and turkey production. The breeding programs for broilers include Ross, Arbor Acres, Indian River, Rowan Range and Specialty Males, along with additional programs under its subsidiary Hubbard. In turkey breeding, the programs Nicholas Turkeys, Hockenhull Turkeys and B.U.T. are part of the portfolio. Besides breeding, Aviagen also engages in research and development.
2. Layer Breeding and Reproduction: This area covers laying hen breeding (basic breeding/genetics) and production. Lohmann Breeders (Germany), Hy-Line International (USA), H&N International (Germany) and Novogen SAS (France) each run independent breeding programs worldwide. Approximately 2–3 billion of the 7 billion laying hens globally are from EW Group breeding programs. Lohmann Breeders, Hy-Line International and H&N International have been part of the family business since the 1980s, while Novogen, established in 2008 in France, joined the EW Group in 2022 and operates across 12 locations.
3. Fish Breeding: AquaGen, headquartered in Norway, focuses on breeding salmon and trout. GenoMar, also based in Norway, specializes in the breeding and production of tilapia.
4. Plant Breeding: This area is managed by Planasa, which breeds and propagates fruit and vegetable varieties such as blueberries, raspberries, strawberries, garlic, asparagus and avocados. Planasa has 225 registered varieties. Founded as a family business in 1973, Planasa was acquired by the EW Group in 2023. That year, the company reported over €70 million in revenue, operates across eight locations, and employs around 4,000 people.
5. Animal Health: The Vaxxinova group, established in 2010, covers the animal health sector. Its product portfolio includes vaccines and other veterinary medicines for poultry, swine, cattle, fish and companion animals. Vaxxinova operates production, research and development and diagnostic facilities in more than 10 countries, including its headquarters in Nijmegen.
6. Diagnostics: Hygiena and BioChek are active in diagnostics. In 2020, the EW Group, through BioChek, acquired Biotecon, a company specializing in food diagnostics. In 2021, EW Group acquired Hygiena (California), a producer of One Health diagnostics solutions that promote food safety throughout the value chain. Following the acquisition, BioChek and Biotecon were integrated into Hygiena. Hygiena has partnerships with over 180 distributors in more than 100 countries worldwide and has over 10,000 customers in more than 100 countries.
7. SPF and Clean Eggs: This business area is represented by VALO BioMedia. VALO BioMedia produces vaccine eggs. These are used for the production of vaccines as well as in pharmaceutical research. Founded in 2011, VALO BioMedia operates six locations.
8. Animal Nutrition: EW Nutrition reflects this sector by producing feed and food additives. The "Automation/Technology" division includes the activities of Agri Advanced Technologies (AAT) and Innovatec Hatchery Automation, based in Asperen, Netherlands. These companies provide technological solutions across the poultry sector, including in ovo sex determination, vaccination and automated sorting and vaccination machines.
9. Food: This segment covers activities along the entire value chain, from mushroom substrate production to the cultivation and distribution of mushroom products. These activities are managed by Pilzland Vertriebs GmbH, formerly known as Wiesenhof Pilzland Vertriebsgesellschaft mbH. In 2015, the EW Group acquired a minority stake in Plukon Food Group, a Dutch poultry processing company and one of Europe's largest poultry groups. EIPRO, part of EW Group since 2019, develops, produces and distributes egg products for the food service industry, large-scale consumers and retailers across Europe. EIPRO produces various products, including liquid egg products, frozen convenience products and pasteurised eggs and plant-based products. The company was founded in 2019 and employs around 200 people.
10. Grain Storage and Farming: The Magdeburger Getreide GmbH (MGG) group of companies is responsible for the 'Grain Storage and Farming' division. MMG's core business includes the trading, storage and processing of grain crops as well as agricultural trade.

=== Research and Development ===
The group's companies are engaged in research and development across four sectors: genetics, diagnostics, nutrition and health. Their primary focus is on protein production, vaccine development and the provision of diagnostic procedures.

== Criticism ==
Animal welfare organizations have criticized that the breed Ross is so fast-growing that their hearts and bone structures are compromised, leading to a higher mortality, lameness and muscle disease.

The subsidiary Lohmann Tierzucht (since 2020 named Lohmann Breeders) was legally convicted of animal cruelty in 2011.

Following egg shortages in the US in 2024 and 2025, Matt Stoller reported on the highly consolidated egg market of which EW Group is part and its negative effects on the global supply of egg-laying hens and eggs.
