= Poultry Science Association =

American poultry science organization

- Abbreviation: PSA
- Formation: July 22, 1908; 118 years ago
- Founder: James E. Rice
- Founded at: Cornell University
- Type: Professional association
- Purpose: "…advancing the discovery, dissemination and application of knowledge in the poultry sciences."
- Headquarters: Champaign, Illinois
- Coordinates: 40.116054°N 88.311753°W
- Region served: United States; Canada
- Fields: Poultry science
- Members: 1800 (2022)
- President: Tom E. Porter
- Secretary-Treasurer: Douglas F. Britton
- First Vice President: Brian D. Fairchild
- Second Vice President: Martin J. Zuidhof
- Website: poultryscience.org

The Poultry Science Association (PSA) is an American non-profit professional organization for the advancement of poultry science. Founded in 1908, the PSA is headquartered in Champaign, Illinois.

Consisting of 1800 members, PSA is involved in research, education, nutrition, and processing of poultry-based products, including chicken, quail, turkey, and duck. Its two journals are Poultry Science and Journal of Applied Poultry Research.

Its youngest ever President was Prof Frederick Hutt of the University of Minnesota in 1932 (then aged 34).

== See also ==
- Poultry farming in the United States
