= Francis Albert Eley Crew =

English animal geneticist (1886–1973)

Brigadier Crew in 1945.

Francis Albert Eley Crew FRS FRSE (2 March 1886 – 26 May 1973) was an English animal geneticist. He was a pioneer in his field leading to the University of Edinburgh's place as a world leader in the science of animal genetics. He was the first Director of the Institute of Animal Breeding and the first Professor of Animal Genetics. He is said to have laid the foundations of medical genetics.

== Life ==
Francis Albert Eley Crew was born in Tipton in England on 2 March 1886 the only surviving son of Thomas Crew, a grocer. He attended King Edward's School, Birmingham and the High School in Birmingham. From an early age he took an interest in breeding bantam chickens, and won prizes at local shows. He studied medicine at the University of Edinburgh, studying under Arthur Dukinfield Darbishire and Edward Albert Sharpey-Schafer, and graduating MB ChB in 1912.

In the First World War he served in the Royal Army Medical Corps, rising to the rank of Major. He was on active service with the 3rd Field Ambulance Service in France. Professor Alan William Greenwood ran the institute during Crew's wartime absence.

In 1920 Sharpey-Schafer approached him, asking him to run the newly created animal breeding research station in Edinburgh. This was originally housed at High School Yards, transferring to King's Buildings in 1924, there linking to the Chemistry Department. His staff at the institute was illustrious: including John Burdon Sanderson Haldane, Lancelot Hogben, Julian Huxley, Bertold Paul Wiesner and (as a postgraduate) Honor Fell. At this time the UK's first Pregnancy Diagnosis Laboratory was also set up under Crew as a tangential area of public benefit, linked to their research. In the 1930s its staff was increased by scientists from Germany and Italy including Hermann Joseph Muller, Charlotte Auerbach and Guido Pontecorvo.

In 1921 he received a doctorate (DSc) on his work on sex-determination in frogs. He received an MD the same year and a PhD in 1923 on the achondroplasia-like condition met with in cattle, specifically the Dexter cattle breed. In 1928 he was created the first Professor of Animal Genetics at the University of Edinburgh, a chair indirectly funded by the Rockefeller Foundation.

In 1922, he was elected a Fellow of the Royal Society of Edinburgh. His proposers were James Cossar Ewart, Edward Albert Sharpey-Schafer, James Hartley Ashworth and Sir Robert Blyth Greig. In 1929 Frederick Hutt travelled from Canada and sought Crew out to specifically study genetics under him, and later was to fill his role in the world of animal genetics. He served as the Society's Secretary from 1931 to 1936 and as vice-president from 1936 to 1939. He won the Society's Keith Medal for the period 1937–39. In 1939 he was elected a Fellow of the Royal Society of London.

During the Second World War he established the Polish School of Medicine in Edinburgh, which survived until 1949 and had a total of 228 graduates. In 1940, he was commanding officer of the Military Hospital at Edinburgh Castle, and a member of the Faculty of Medicine at the University of Edinburgh. He saw that the Polish forces included medical professors, lecturers and students and conceived the idea of these students being taught by their own teachers in Polish. He proposed establishing a Polish Medical Faculty in the University of Edinburgh, supported by the dean of the medical faculty, Professor Sydney Smith. The move was approved by the University Senate with the backing of the Principal, Sir Thomas Holland. The university signed an agreement with the Polish Government in Exile in London, headed by General Wladyslaw Sikorski, on 24 February 1941, to create the Polish School of Medicine. Crew was one of eight Scottish professors in the school, working alongside ten Polish professors. On 28 May 1943, the President of the Polish Republic, Władysław Raczkiewicz, created Crew a Commander of the Order "Polonia Restituta" alongside Professor Sydney Smith and Sir Thomas Holland, at a ceremony in the university's McEwan Hall.

On 4 June 1946, Crew attended a special graduation ceremony at the University of Edinburgh marking the 5th anniversary of the Polish School of Medicine's foundation. Professor John Crofton, dean of the medical faculty, said in the opening address: "[...] to bring about the Polish School of Medicine [...] required a substantial pinch of imagination as a catalyst. This un-British ingredient was provided by Professor Frank Crew [...], but of course in respect of imagination Professor Crew is at least a couple of standard deviations from the British mean."

During the war Crew was also Director of Medical Research for the War Office, with the rank of Brigadier.

In 1944 he succeeded Percy Samuel Lelean in the Bruce and John Usher Chair in Public Health at the University of Edinburgh. In 1955 he moved to Ain Shams University in Cairo as Professor of Social and Preventative Medicine. In 1957-8 he worked for the World Health Organization as a visiting professor at the University of Rangoon.

In 1958 the University of Edinburgh awarded him a Doctor of Letters (LLD).

He died on 26 May 1973.

== Publications ==
- Animal Genetics: An Introduction to the Science of Animal Breeding (1925)
- Organic Inheritance in Man (1927)
- Genetics of Sexuality in Animals (1927)
- Heredity (1928)
- Sex Determination (1933)
- Genetics in Relation to Clinical Medicine (1947)
- Measurements of the Public Health (1948)
- Must Man Wage War?: Biological Aspects of War (1952)
- The Official Medical History of the Second World War (5 volumes) (1953–66)
- The Army Medical Services: Campaigns Volume I (1956)
- The Foundations of Genetics (1966)

== Family ==
He married Helen Campbell Dykes, a fellow medical student, in 1912. She died in 1971 and he remarried the following year to Margaret Ogilvie Withof-Keus, who had previously served under him in the RAMC.

== Artistic recognition ==
His portrait, painted by Alfred Edward Borthwick, forms part of the Edinburgh University Art Collection. The National Portrait Gallery holds a bromide print of Crew taken by Walter Stoneman in 1945.

== Other Recognition ==
The Crew Building on Alexander Crum Brown Road at Kings Buildings is named after him.
