= Pastured poultry =

Sustainable agriculture technique

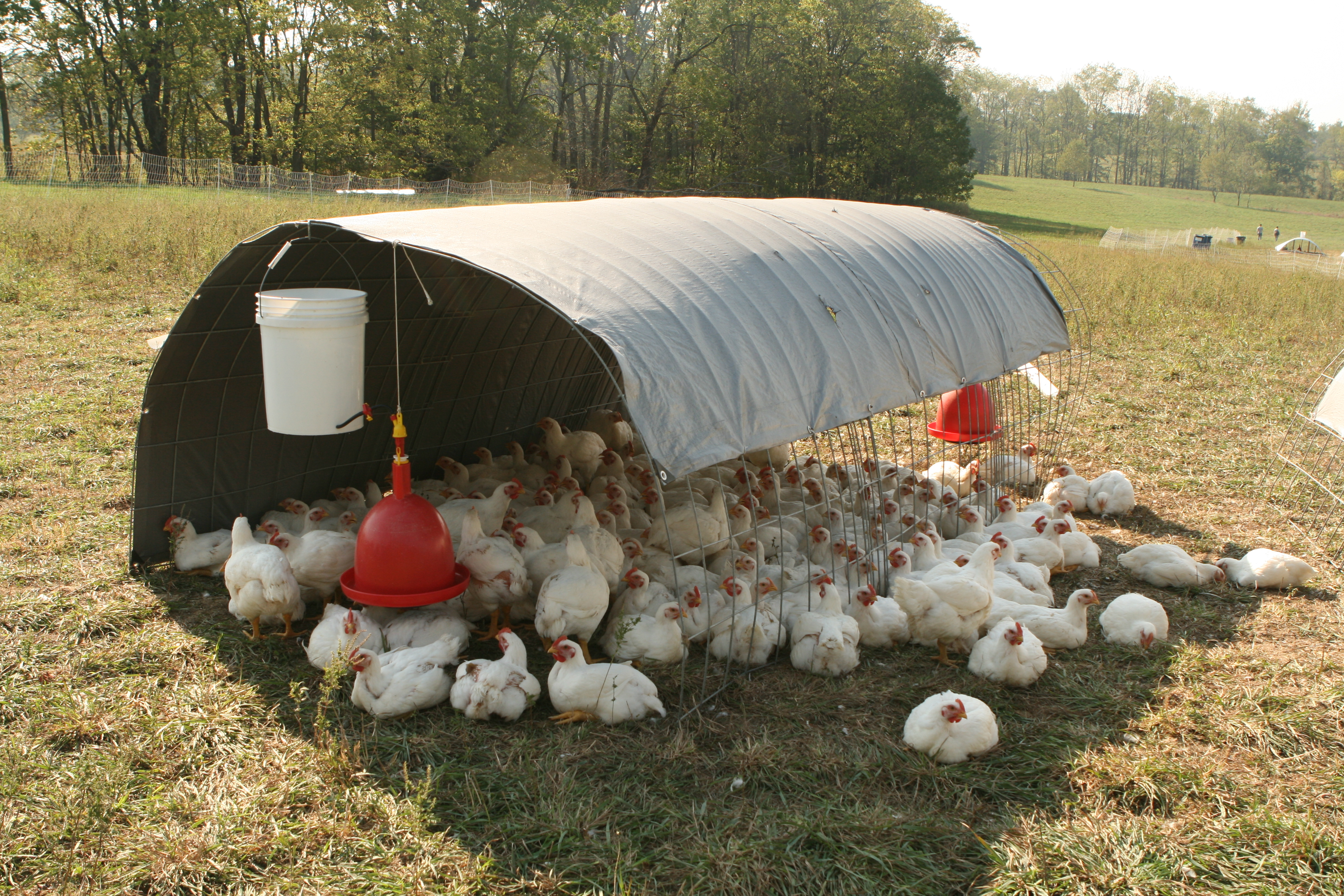
A free range pastured chicken system

Pastured poultry, also known as pasture-raised poultry or pasture-raised eggs, is a sustainable agriculture technique that calls for the raising of laying chickens, meat chickens (broilers), guinea fowl, and/or turkeys on pasture, as opposed to indoor confinement like in battery cage hens, or in some cage-free and free range setups with limited outdoor access. Humane treatment and the perceived health benefits of pastured poultry are causing an increase in demand for such products.

Joel Salatin of Swoope, Virginia, helped to reintroduce the technique at Polyface Farm, and wrote his book Pastured Poultry Profits to spread the idea to other farmers. Andy Lee and Herman Beck-Chenoweth expanded on Salatin's techniques, and created some of their own.

The American Pastured Poultry Producers' Association (APPPA) was formed to promote pastured poultry. Its membership consists largely of pastured poultry farmers.

Though pasture feeding improves the nutritive quality of ruminant meats, the effect of pasture feeding on poultry meat composition is not well established. One trial showed low impact of pasture feeding on vitamin E and fatty acid composition.

The pens that house the fowl can be made from wood and scrap metal or out of PVC pipe and white tarps.

Pastured poultry is also gaining popularity because it helps the farmer, through reducing capital costs, and increasing pasture fertility. It is very well suited for incorporation within a system of managed intensive grazing.

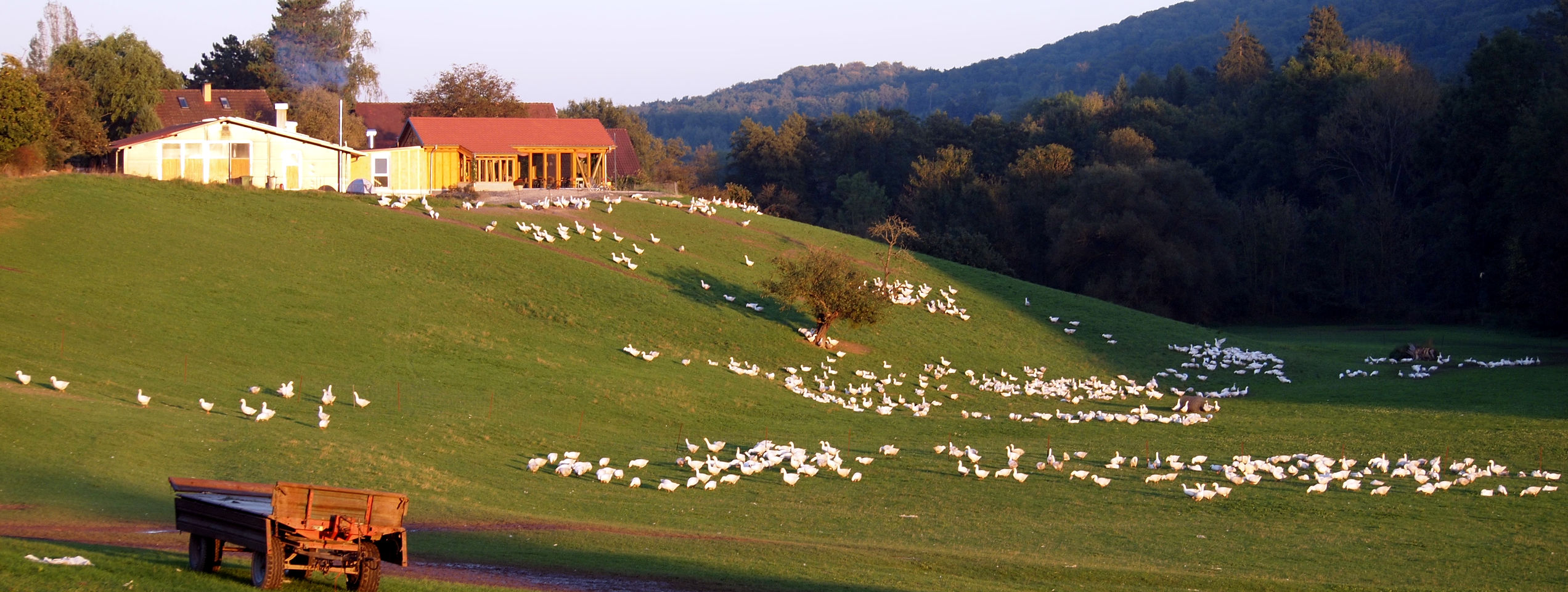
Pastured geese

Pastured poultry is not limited to chickens and turkeys. It includes a variety of other birds, including ducks, geese, and exotics in the poultry family.

In the United States, "pastured poultry" or "pasture-raised" claims for poultry are not defined by the United States Department of Agriculture. Because there is no legal definition of the term, producers are not required to verify their claims on food packaging, as long as they are not misleading.

== See also ==
- Chickens as pets
- Chicken tractor
- Free range
- Free-range eggs
- Grass-fed beef
- Heritage turkey
- Organic eggs
- Cage-free eggs
- Battery cage hens
- Yarding - fenced yard outside the poultry house
