= Rotational grazing =

System of grazing moving animals between paddocks around the year

Diagram of rotational grazing, showing the use of paddocks, each providing food and water for the livestock for a chosen period

In agriculture, rotational grazing, as opposed to continuous grazing, describes many systems of pasturing, whereby livestock are moved to portions of the pasture, called paddocks, while the other portions rest. Each paddock must provide all the needs of the livestock, such as food, water and sometimes shade and shelter. The approach often produces lower outputs than more intensive animal farming operations, but requires lower inputs, and therefore sometimes produces higher net farm income per animal.

== Approach ==
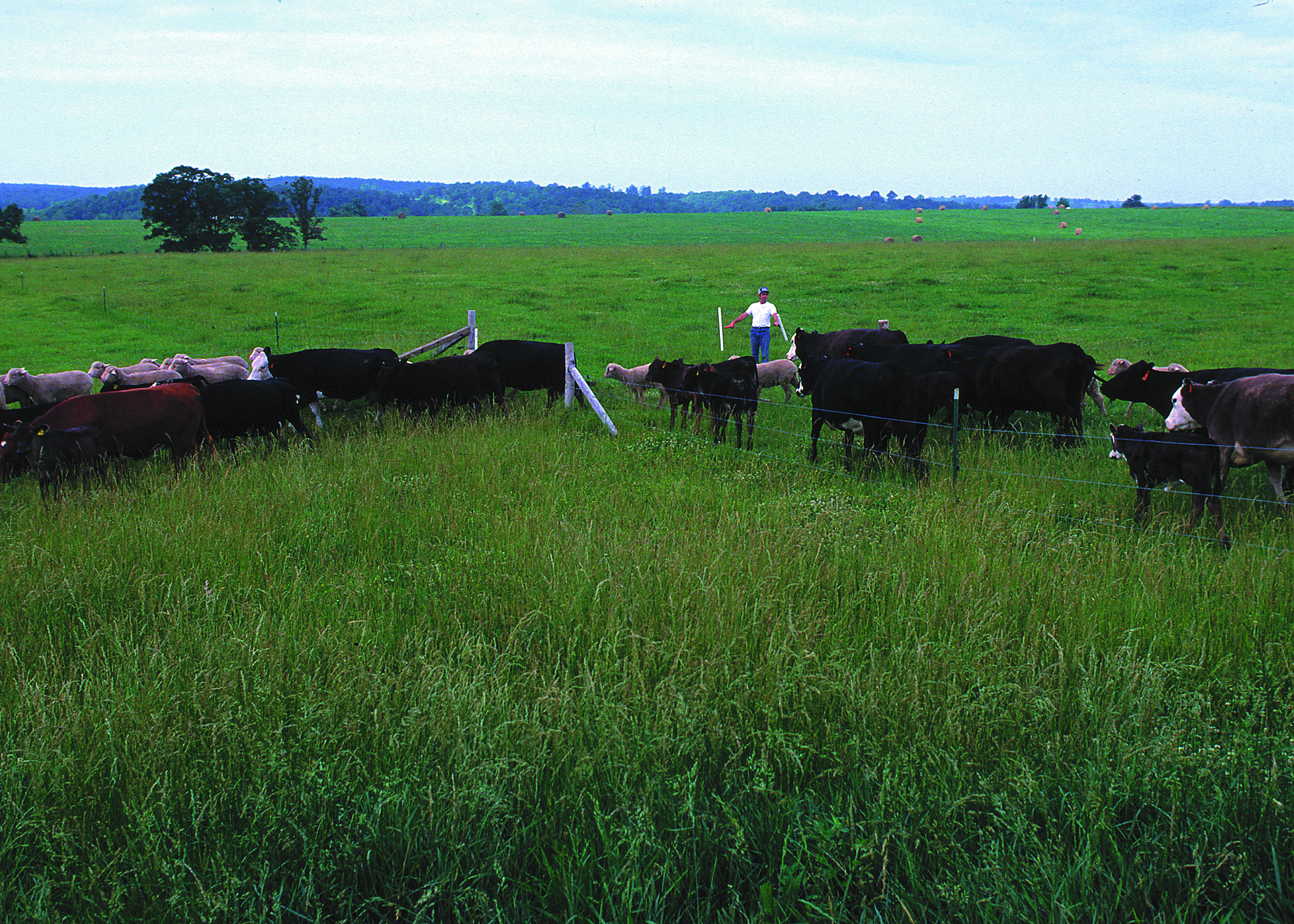
Rotational grazing of cattle and sheep in Missouri with pasture divided into paddocks, each grazed in turn for a period and then rested

In rotational grazing livestock are moved to portions of the pasture, called paddocks, while the other portions rest. The intent is to allow the pasture plants and soil time to recover.

Healing native rangeland may require a combination of burning and rotational grazing.

Rotational grazing can be used with ruminants such as cattle, sheep or goats; non-ruminants such as pigs can also be used. The herds graze one portion of pasture, or a paddock, while allowing the others to recover. The length of time a paddock is grazed will depend on the size of the herd and the size of the paddock and local environmental factors. Resting grazed lands allows the vegetation to regrow. Rotational grazing is especially effective because grazers do better on the more tender younger plant stems. These systems may or may not leave parasites behind to die off, minimizing or eliminating the need for de-wormers, depending if the rotational time is smaller or larger than the parasitic life cycle.

== Benefits ==
Herd health benefits arise from animals having access to both space and fresh air. Freedom of movement within a paddock results in increased physical fitness, which limits the potential for injuries and abrasion, and sometimes depending on the system reduces the potential of exposure to high levels of harmful disease-causing microorganisms and insects.

In a concentrated animal feeding operation it is normal for a large number of animals to continuously occupy a small area. By comparison, with managed grazing, the animals are able to live in a more natural environment. The animals experience less disease and fewer foot ailments, depending on the rotational system being used.

Managed rotational grazing is a key component of a regenerative agriculture system, as it functions as a constant feedback loop. Rotational grazing has been said to be more environmentally friendly in certain cases. Many pastures undergoing certain types of rotational grazing are less susceptible to soil erosion. Paddocks might require fewer inputs. These grazing regimes are sometimes said to be more resilient and more capable of responding to changing environmental conditions. Rotational grazing may reduce greenhouse gas emissions such as carbon dioxide, nitrous oxides, and methane. One study looking at finishing stages suggested that adaptive multi-paddock grazing could result in a net carbon sink. However, the study's authors have cautioned that the results are limited in scope as they are only looking at one stage of an experimental system. Other studies have also found some land may sequester just as much or more without any grazing.

== Problems ==
A key element of this style of animal husbandry is that either each grazed area must contain all elements needed for the animals (water source, for instance) or the feed or water source must be moved each time the animals are moved. Having fixed feeding or watering stations can defeat the rotational aspect, leading to degradation of the ground around the water supply or feed supply if additional feed is provided to the animals. Special care must be taken to ensure that high use areas do not become areas where mud, parasites or diseases are spread or communicated.

Several problems are related to shade in pasture areas. Although shade provides relief from heat and reduces the risk of heat stress, animals tend to congregate in these areas which leads to nutrient loading, uneven grazing, and potential soil erosion.

Ruminal tympany, also known as bloat, is a common serious problem when ruminants graze on fresh, young pasture, and if left untreated can be fatal. This problem occurs when foam producing compounds in plants are digested by cows, causing foam to form in the rumen of the animal and not allowing animals to properly belch gas. Animals are especially susceptible to bloat if they are moved to new pasture sources when they are particularly hungry and especially on young, fresh and wet legumes. It is therefore important to ensure that the herd is eating enough at the end of a rotation when forage will be more scarce, limiting the potential for animals to gorge themselves when turned out onto new paddocks. The risk of bloat can be mitigated by careful management of rotations, seeding the non-bloating European legume species Lotus corniculatus in pasturelands, reducing the amount of legumes/increasing grasses, providing sufficient supplemental feeding and extra fodder when turning out on new paddocks, reducing the size of the paddock when livestock is first turned out, and daily rations of the anti-foaming agent poloxalene mixed well into the fodder.

== Weed control ==
A well managed rotational grazing system has low pasture weed establishment because the majority of niches are already filled with established forage species, making it harder for weeds to compete and become established. The use of multiple species in the pasture helps to minimize weeds. Established forage plants in rotational grazing pasture systems are healthy and unstressed due to the "rest" period, enhancing the competitive advantage of the forage. Additionally, in comparison to grain crop production, many plants which would be considered weeds are not problematic in perennial pasture. However, certain species such as thistles and various other weeds, are indigestible or poisonous to grazers. These plant species will not be grazed by the herd and can be recognized for their prevalence in pasture systems.

A key step in managing weeds in any pasture system is identification. Once the undesired species in a pasture system are identified, an integrated approach to management can be implemented to control weed populations. No single approach to weed management will result in weed free pastures; therefore, various cultural, mechanical, and chemical control methods can be combined in a weed management plan. Cultural controls include: avoiding spreading manure contaminated with weed seeds, cleaning equipment after working in weed infested areas, and managing weed problems in fencerows and other areas near pastures. Mechanical controls such as repeated mowing, clipping, and hand weeding can also be used to effectively manage weed infestations by weakening the plant. These methods should be implemented when weed flower buds are closed or just starting to open to prevent seed production. Although these first two methods reduce need for herbicides, weed problems may still persist in managed grazing systems and the use of herbicides may become necessary. Use of herbicides may restrict the use of a pasture for some length of time, depending on the type and amount of the chemical used. Frequently, weeds in pasture systems are patchy and therefore spot treatment of herbicides may be used as a least cost method of chemical control.

== Nutrient availability and soil fertility ==
If pasture systems are seeded with more than 40% legumes, commercial nitrogen fertilization is unnecessary for adequate plant growth. Legumes are able to fix atmospheric nitrogen, thus providing nitrogen for themselves and surrounding plants.

Although grazers remove nutrient sources from the pasture system when they feed on forage sources, the majority of the nutrients consumed by the herd are returned to the pasture system through manure. At a relatively high stocking rate, or high ratio of animals per hectare, manure will be evenly distributed across the pasture system. The nutrient content in these manure sources should be adequate to meet plant requirements, making commercial fertilization unnecessary. Rotational grazing systems are often associated with increased soil fertility which arises because manure is a rich source of organic matter that increases the health of soil. In addition, these pasture system are less susceptible to erosion because the land base has continuous ground cover throughout the year.

High levels of fertilizers entering waterways are a pertinent environmental concern associated with agricultural systems. However, rotational grazing systems effectively reduce the amount of nutrients that move off-farm which have the potential to cause environmental degradation. These systems are fertilized with on-farm sources, and are less prone to leaching as compared to commercial fertilizers. Additionally, the system is less prone to excess nutrient fertilization, so the majority of nutrients put into the system by manure sources are utilized for plant growth. Permanent pasture systems also have deeper, better established forage root systems which are more efficient at taking up nutrients from within the soil profile.

== Economics ==
Confinement operations are more intensive, producing higher outputs for that land but requiring higher inputs from other acreage and additional labour and machinery, so rotational grazing often generates greater net farm income per cow.

Although milk yields are often lower in rotational systems, net farm income per cow is often greater as compared to confinement operations. This is due to the additional costs associated with herd health and purchased feeds are greatly reduced in management intensive rotational grazing systems. Additionally, a transition to rotational grazing is associated with low start-up and maintenance costs. Another consideration is that while production per cow is less, the number of cows per acre on the pasture can increase. The net effect is more productivity per acre at less cost.

The main costs associated with transitioning rotational grazing are purchasing fencing, fencers, and water supply materials. If a pasture was continuously grazed in the past, likely capital has already been invested in fencing and a fencer system. Cost savings to graziers can also be recognized when one considers that many of the costs associated with livestock operations are transmitted to the grazers. For example, the grazers actively harvest their own sources of food for the portion of the year where grazing is possible. This translates into lower costs for feed production and harvesting, which are fuel intensive endeavors. Rotational grazing systems rely on the grazers to produce fertilizer sources via their excretion. There is also no need for collection, storage, transportation, and application of manure, which are also all fuel intensive. Additionally, external fertilizer use contributes to other costs such as labor, purchasing costs.

Rotational grazing results in time savings because the majority of work which might otherwise require human labor is transmitted to the herd.

== Technology ==
A number of technological innovations have allowed for improved grazing management systems:

- A Grazing stick or "Pasture Stick" is a low-tech tool that allows for ranchers and farmers to estimate the tonnage of forageable pasture feed in any given area with decent accuracy. The measurements on the stick include forage height, forage density, and available dry matter per acre. This can help determine stocking density for effective stocking rates. It is also important to note that it is only a forage estimation tool, not an animal nutrition tool.
- Virtual fencing is an emerging technology that uses GPS-enabled collars and auditory cues to influence and control livestock movement without the use of fencing. These systems allow farmers/ranchers to automate rotations and reduce labor costs, however, they still remain at low adoption rates.
- Satellite imagery and drone-based remote sensing systems can be used by farmers/ranchers to monitor pasture health, soil moisture, and vegetation cover at a distance.
- Grazing Planners and Software exist as a digital solution to drive insights into pasture growth, rotation schedules, and animal performance. This approach can incorporate user input, weather data, and satellite imagery to generate optimized grazing plans.

== Criticism ==
Managers have found that rotational grazing systems can work for diverse management purposes, but scientific experiments have demonstrated that some rotational grazing systems do not always necessarily work for specific ecological purposes. This controversy stems from two main categorical differences in rotational grazing, prescribed management and adaptive management. The performance of rangeland grazing strategies are similarly constrained by several ecological variables establishing that differences among them are dependent on the effectiveness of those management models. Depending on the management model, plant production has been shown to be equal or greater in continuous compared to rotational grazing in 87% of the experiments.

== Incentives ==
=== United States ===
In the United States, incentives for managed rotational grazing operations are found throughout the Farm Bill, an omnibus package of federal legislation passed roughly once every five years. Within this package, conservation programs such as the Environmental Quality Incentive Program (EQIP) and the Conservation Stewardship Program (CSP) focus on providing financial and technical support to working lands, such as ranches.

Managed rotational grazing is included as an eligible conservation practice for funding under EQIP. Applicants must have a certified grazing plan in place, written and approved by certified grazing planners. The most common grazing practices under this program are grazing management design and identification of necessary materials, prescribed grazing that includes animal rotation and pasture resting, and mechanical treatment to improve soil and plant conditions.

In contrast, CSP is intended to provide "whole-farm" financial and technical assistance to farmers who combine basic conservation activities with more substantial interventions. Grazing enhancements eligible for CSP funding include:

- Management Intensive Rotational Grazing
- Installing electrical fence offsets and wire to facilitate cross-fencing for improved grazing management
- Grazing management that improves or maintains watersheds, pollinator habitat, or wildlife
- Prescribed grazing that protects sensitive areas from gully erosion as well as surface or ground water from nutrients
- Strategically planned patch burning for grazing distribution and wildlife habitat
- Grazing to reduce wildfire risks in forests
- Improved grazing management on pasture for plant productivity and health with monitoring activities
- Maintaining forage quality and quantity for animal health and productivity

Other Farm Bill programs that may impact grazing incentives:

- Conservation Reserve Program (CRP)
- Agriculture Conservation Easement Program (ACEP)
- Grazing Lands Conservation Initiative (GLCI)

There are a number of private and non-profit initiatives that offer payments for the ecosystem services associated with improved grazing outcomes. The majority link their payments and crediting systems (e.g. carbon markets) to verified increases in soil organic carbon through on farm soil testing.

== See also ==
- Electric fence
- Free range
- Ley farming
- Pastured poultry
- Rangeland management
- Soil conservation
- Transhumance
- Yarding
