= Organic egg production =

Egg production through organic means

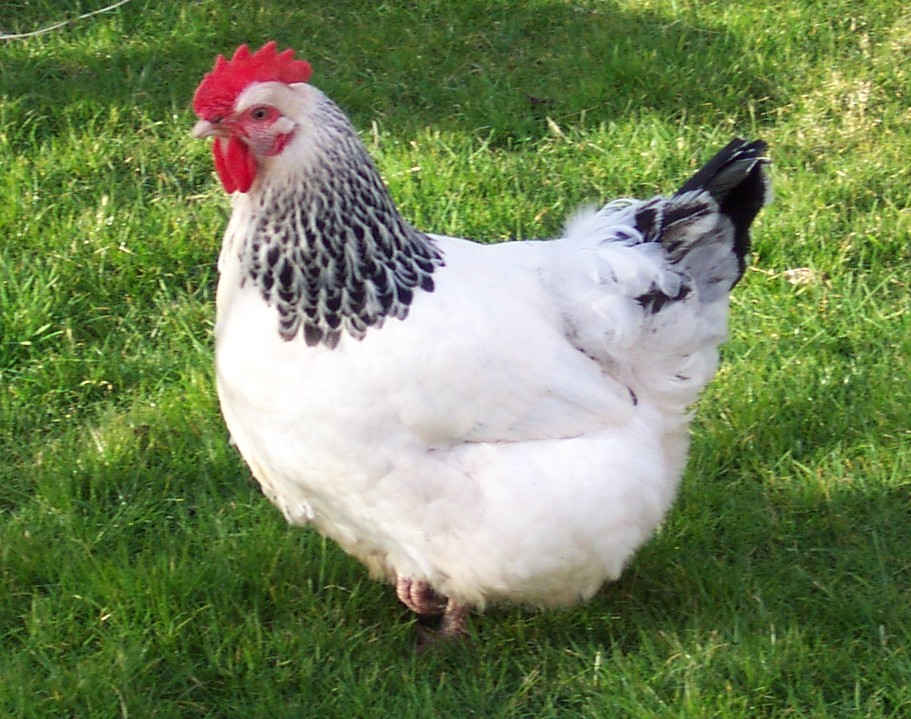
Sussex Hen outdoors.

Organic egg production is the production of eggs through organic means. In this process, the poultry are fed organic feed. According to the United States Department of Agriculture, organic means that the laying hens must have access to the outdoors and cannot be raised in cages. Only natural molting can occur within the flock; forced molting is not allowed. Organic certification also requires maintenance of basic animal welfare standards.

== Differences between "free range" and "organic" ==
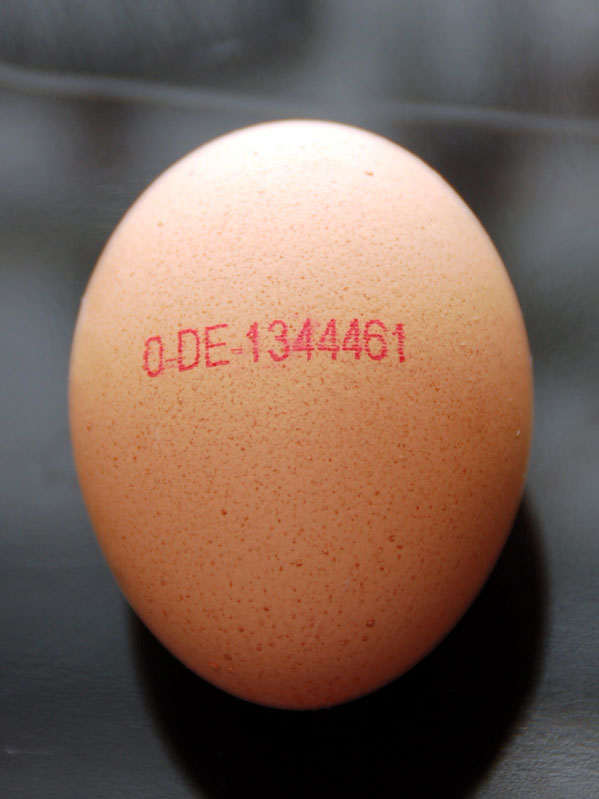
German organic egg with only the EU egg code

Significant differences cover feed, medication, and animal welfare. Organic hens are fed organic feed; it is prohibited to feed animal byproducts or GMO crops – which is not disallowed in free range environments; no antibiotics allowed except in emergencies (in free range, it is up to the farmer, but the same levels of antibiotics as conventional farming is allowed); required animal welfare standards in organic farms are higher, which can improve the quality of both the eggs and the meat.

In the European Union (EU), to identify and trace egg production, a unique code must legally be printed on all eggs. A "0" code distinguishes organic farming eggs. The regulation on egg marking includes four levels with strict requirements on husbandry conditions. While free-range and indoor keeping requires 1100 cm^{2} indoor space per hen it makes 1667 cm^{2} (or 6 hens per square meter) the minimum for organic farming.

== Organic feed ==
Organic feed is grown without the use of genetically modified organisms (GMOs), synthetic fertilizers, pesticides or herbicides. It is often grown by certified organic farmers, whose practices are monitored for three years prior to being certified organic. If the crop is contaminated by cross-fertilization with GMOs, it is rendered useless for organic grading. Finally, there can be no animal by-products in organic feed.

== Living conditions ==
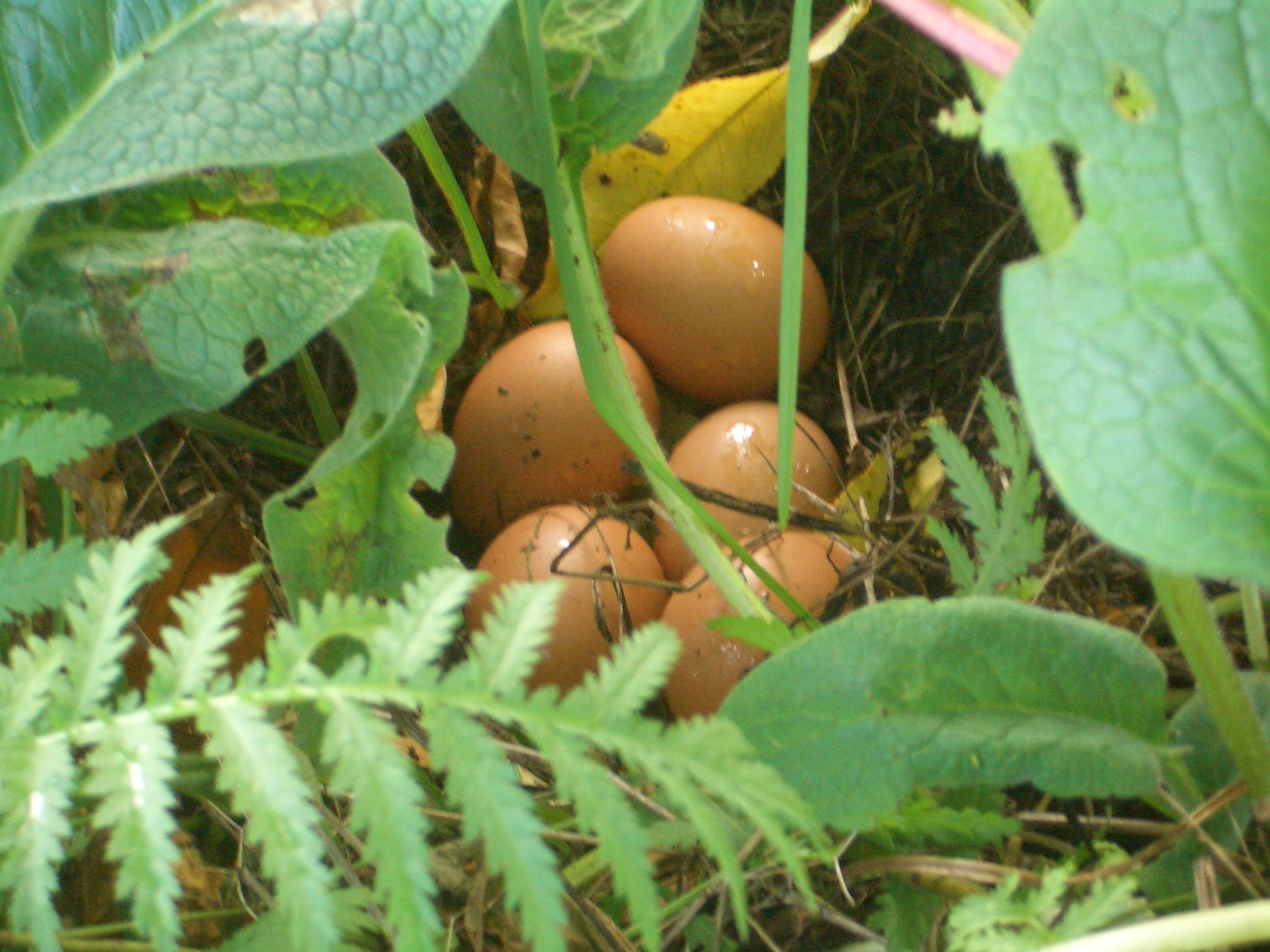
At an organic farm (in Bruthen, Victoria) chickens sometimes end up laying eggs somewhere other than the owner expected

In the United States, "organic" egg production means that the flock may not live in cages and must have access to outdoor areas.

== Antibiotics ==
Organic egg producers cannot feed low-level antibiotics to the poultry. Antibiotics are only allowed during an outbreak of infection or disease.

== Molting ==
Some farms induce molting in their flocks to affect egg production. In organic egg farms, the birds are allowed to go into a natural molt but are not induced.

== Animal welfare ==
Meat, poultry, eggs, and dairy products labeled "organic" must come from animals who are "(m)anaged without antibiotics, added growth hormones, mammalian or avian byproducts, or other prohibited feed ingredients." Farms, processors, and distributors must be inspected by the USDA before they are allowed to use the "organic" label. However, fewer than 5 percent of chickens are raised in accordance with these standards. The "organic" label does not guarantee that animals were treated any better than those raised on conventional CAFOs. The Washington Post reported that large operations are able to sell their eggs as organic because the USDA has "interpreted the word 'outdoors' in such a way that farms that confine their hens to barns but add 'porches' are deemed eligible for the valuable 'USDA Organic' label. The porches are typically walled-in areas with a roof, hard floors and screening on one side." Male chicks who are born on organic or free-range egg farms are still discarded, by the use of lethal gas, because they do not produce eggs.

== Greenhouse gas emissions ==
Compared to caged hens, organic hens produce fewer eggs and required more feed, which resulted in a carbon footprint around 16% higher per kilogram of egg.

== Product quality ==
Honikel (1998) reviewed the studies on organic eggs, concluding that product quality characteristics—such as nutritional, hygienic, sensory, and technological factors—do not differ substantially between organic and conventional eggs.

== See also ==
- Organic certification
- Organic livestock farming
- Free range eggs
- Free range
- Pastured poultry
- The Happy Egg Company
- Battery cage
