= Yarding =

Provision of a fenced yard in poultry keeping

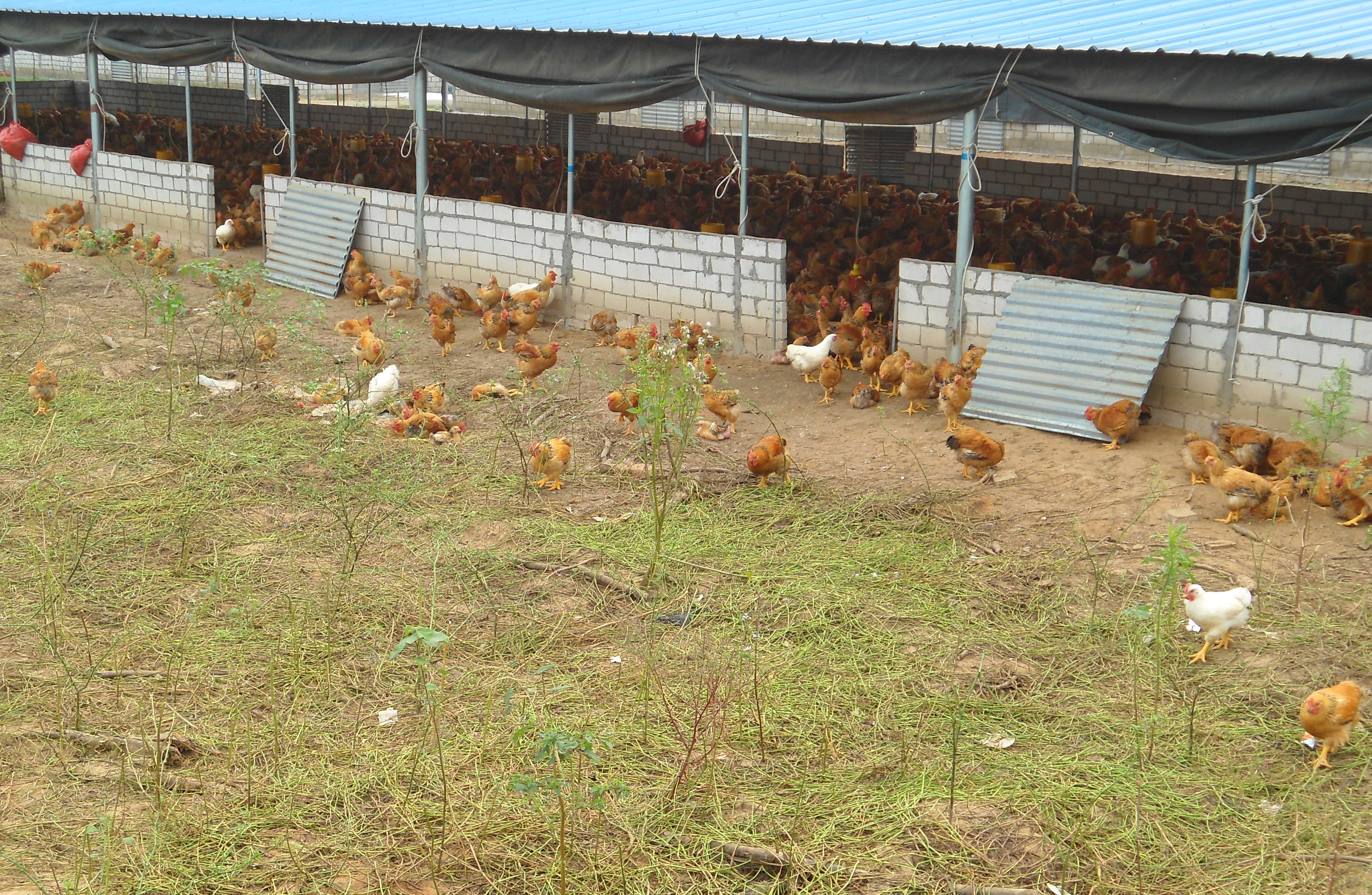
During the daytime, the doors are left open for these chickens to choose whether to be in the yard or coop. This small poultry farm is in Hainan, China.

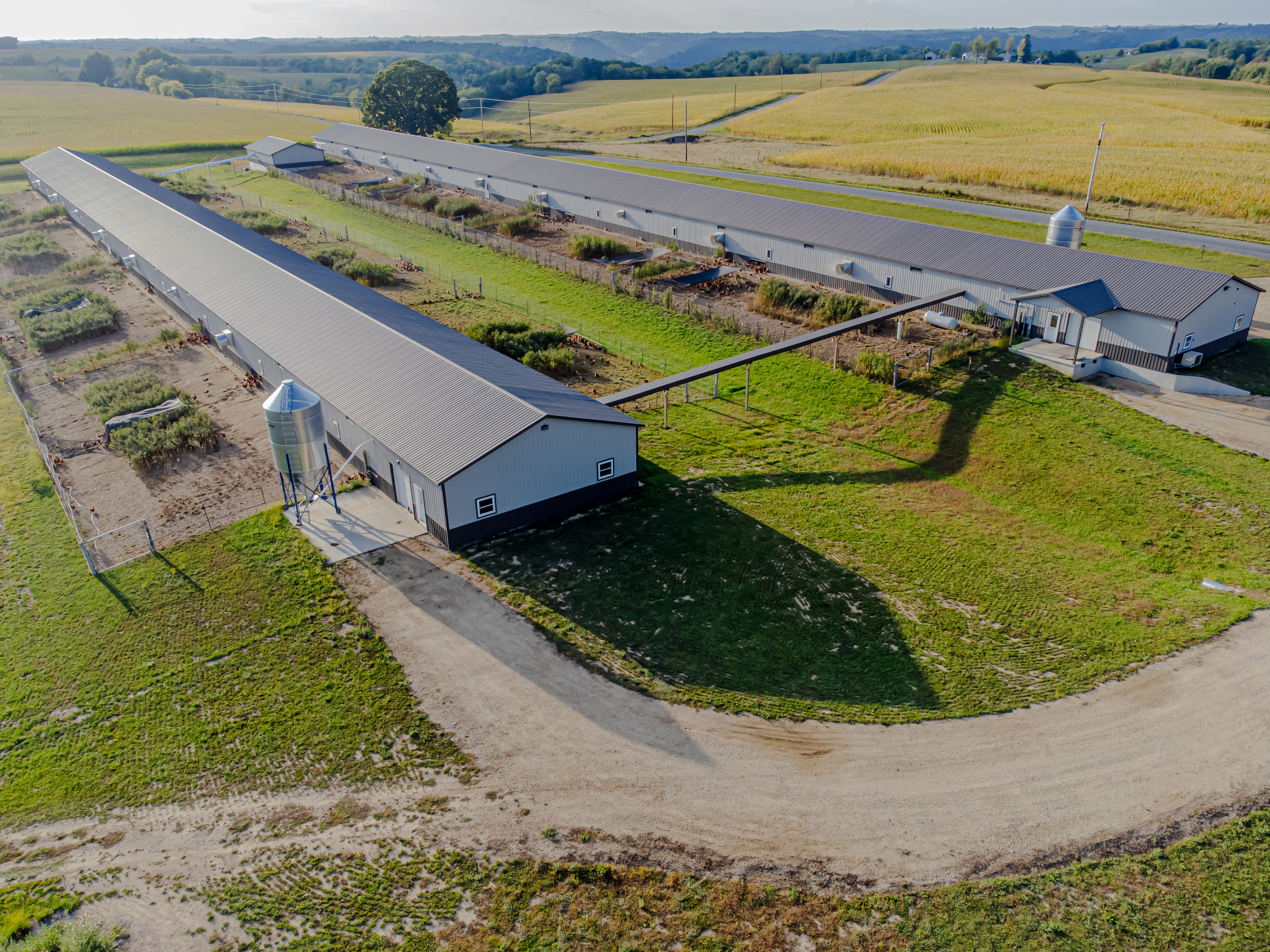
Yarding poultry farm in Vernon County, Wisconsin

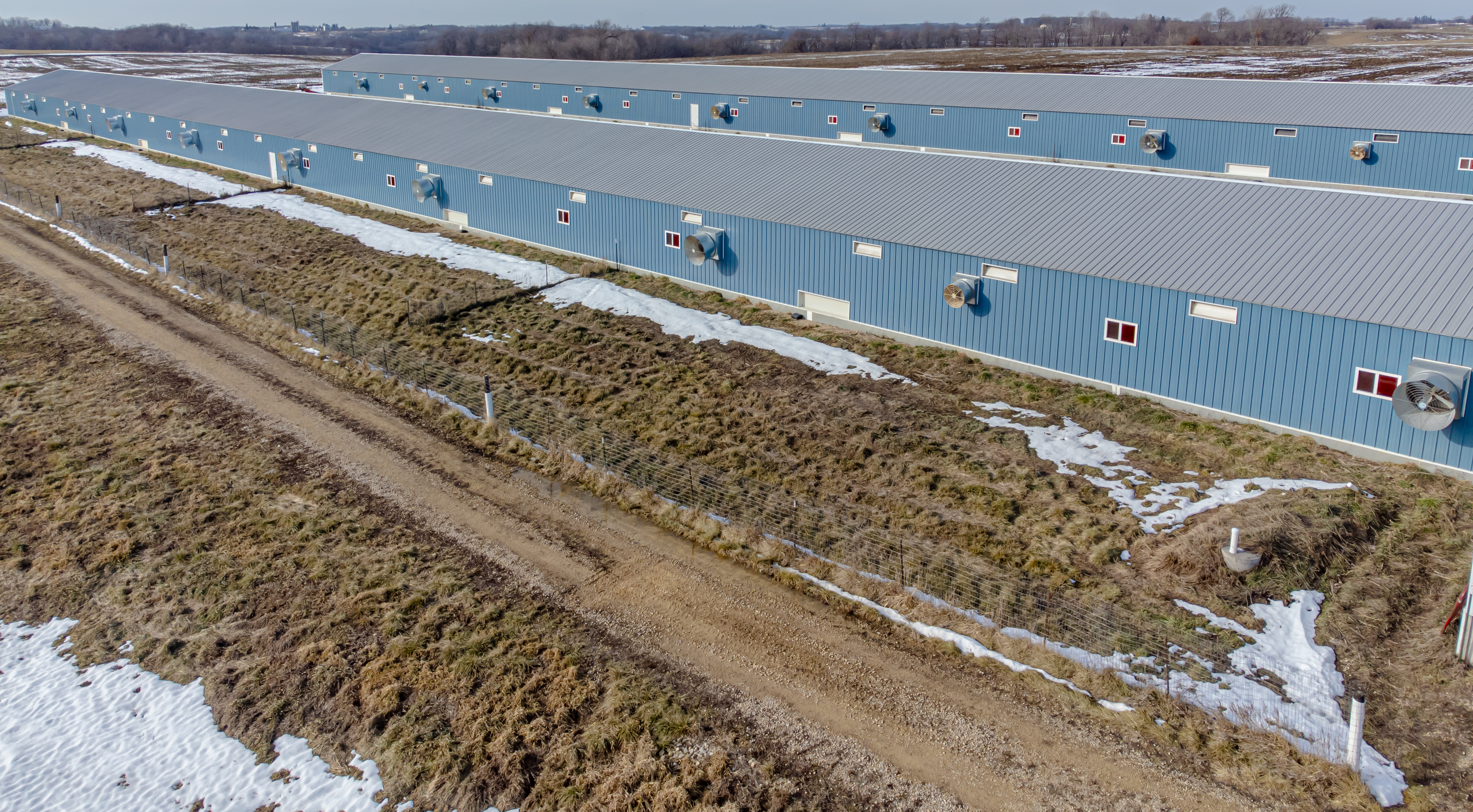
Yarding doors closed in the winter

In poultry keeping, yarding is the practice of providing the poultry with a fenced yard in addition to a poultry house. Movable yarding is a form of managed intensive grazing.

Yarding is often confused with free range. The distinction is that free-range poultry are either totally unfenced, or the fence is so distant that it has little influence on their freedom of movement.

== Historical practice ==
Before the discovery of vitamins A and D in the 1920s, green feed and sunshine were essential to the health of poultry. Vitamin D was synthesized from sunlight on the skin (as with humans), while vitamin A was obtained through green forage plants such as grass. Yards small enough to be fenced economically were soon stripped of palatable green forage and become barren. This is followed by a build-up of manure, parasites, and other pathogens.

Free range husbandry was the most common method in these early days. Most farms had only a small free-range barnyard flock. Larger flocks were kept in small houses build on skids, which were dragged periodically to a fresh piece of ground. This method is similar to the modern practice of pastured poultry.

Experts of the day estimated the sustainable level to be about fifty hens per acre (80 m^{2} per hen), with one hundred hens per acre (40 m^{2} per hen) as an absolute upper limit if special care was taken. These levels are sustainable in the sense that the turf can make use of the nutrients in the manure left behind by the chickens, and in the sense that, at this stocking density, the chickens will not completely destroy the turf through scratching.

At the Oregon Station on clay soil it was found that the day droppings from 200 laying hens on an acre [20 m^{2} per hen] in four years made the soil too rich for the successful growth of cereal crops where cropping the ground was done every other year. The night droppings were put on other land. If the soil contains too much manure for the crops it is safe to assume that it is not in the best condition for poultry. Sooner or later it is bound to show not only in a failure of grain crops but in failure of poultry crops. For a permanent system under average conditions of soil and climate the following points are suggested for consideration.

- Maximum number of fowls per acre: 100 laying hens [40 m^{2} per hen].
- Disposing of the night droppings on other land.
- Dividing the ground into at least two divisions or yards, and growing a crop on each yard at least every other year. In sections where crops may be grown every year the number of fowls may be increased.
- Growing crops that will use up the maximum amount of manure.
- Keeping the ground vacant [of chickens] at least six months in the year.
- Thorough underdrainage, where necessary, to carry off surplus water.

.... It is not assumed that as many as 500 hens may not be profitably kept on an acre [8 m^{2} per hen] for a few years under favorable conditions. It has been done, but it is a different matter when it is planned to make a permanent business of it.

Because fifty hens per acre represents 800 square feet (74 m^{2}) per hen (80 m^{2} per hen), while the density inside the house at the time was normally four square feet per hen (0.4 m^{2} per hen), this required that the yard be 200 times wider than the house, assuming a yard on one side of the house. That is, a house 20 feet (6 m) wide required a yard 4,000 feet (1,220 m) wide to provide the necessary area. This would normally be provided as two yards, one on either side of the house, each 2,000 feet (610 m) wide. In reality, such yards are expensive to fence, and the chickens spend most of their time on the portion closest to the house, so sustainability was never achieved in practice except with portable houses, which were moved periodically to fresh ground. Yarded operations were operated with unsustainably small yards that were quickly denuded and which received excessive levels of manure.

The use of multiple yards, frequent plowing, and liberal use of lime would allow higher stocking levels to be used, since plowing and liming would allow much of the nitrogen to escape from the soil.

The following is typical advice for the successful use of yards in the 1930s and 1940s:

All poultrymen should realize that there are no known substitutes for sunshine and young green grass in keeping poultry in the best possible state of health and in promoting growth and maintaining egg production. Where sunshine and green grass cannot be provided, as in the case of birds kept in strict confinement, the best possible substitutes must be provided. In the case of most farm and many commercial flocks, however, the growing stock is reared on range, and the adult birds are given yards or allowed to roam at will.

If the staggering losses among growing chicks and laying birds that occur annually are to be reduced materially, better methods of flock management must be employed. The losses from mortality are due largely to internal parasites and diseases of one kind or another. Bare ground over which the chickens have run for some time, mud puddles, and stagnant water are the chief sources of the spread of diseases, most of which are filth borne....

The mortality that usually occurs in growing and adult stock may be materially reduced by providing the birds with an alternate yarding system. Probably the best arrangement is to provide each colony brooder and each laying house with three yards (3 m) which the birds would be allowed to use every 3 or 4 weeks. By alternating the birds in the yards every 3 or 4 weeks each yard is kept reasonably sanitary, especially if the soil in the immediate vicinity of the house is cultivated and treated with lime, and young green grass is available for the birds throughout the season. The importance of clean range for both birds and adult stock cannot be emphasized too strongly... For adult stock a good grass sward can be maintained on fertile soil, allowing about 200 birds to the acre [20 m^{2} per hen].

Nutritional advances increasingly turned yarding into a liability, and it fell out of favor. Free range continued to be used, especially for breeding flocks and for pullets before they reached laying age, because of the lower rate of disease and greater overall health of grass-reared chickens. Breeding flocks (which lay eggs destined for incubation) are always given a better diet than flocks laying table eggs, since a diet that will produce table eggs cheaply will not provide eggs that hatch well. For some time after confined laying flocks produced table eggs satisfactorily, breeding flocks benefited from free range

In Britain, Geoffrey Sykes developed a new yarding system in the 1950s. This used a small yard covered with a thick layer of straw, with more straw added frequently. He also recommended that shade and a windbreak be provided by a solid fence around the yard, or by other means, such as rows of haybales. Once a year, the old straw was removed by a front-end loader or similar machinery. This method eliminated mud and pathogens. It was later forgotten because the industry moved to high-density confinement before the method was widely established.

== Recent practice ==
Today, commercial poultry producers generally call yarding free range on their labels. This conflation of two very different techniques has led to confusion. The vast majority of "free-range" operations are really yarded.

Pastured poultry, as promoted by the APPPA, the American Pastured Poultry Producers Association, and author/farmer Joel Salatin, takes a different approach, attempting to achieve the benefits of free range while using penning or yarding. The key element of Pastured poultry is the use of portable housing and the optional use of portable electric fencing. By moving the house and yard frequently, perhaps daily, all the disadvantages of permanent yards are eliminated.

== See also ==
- Chickens as pets
