= Chicken tractor =

Movable chicken coop

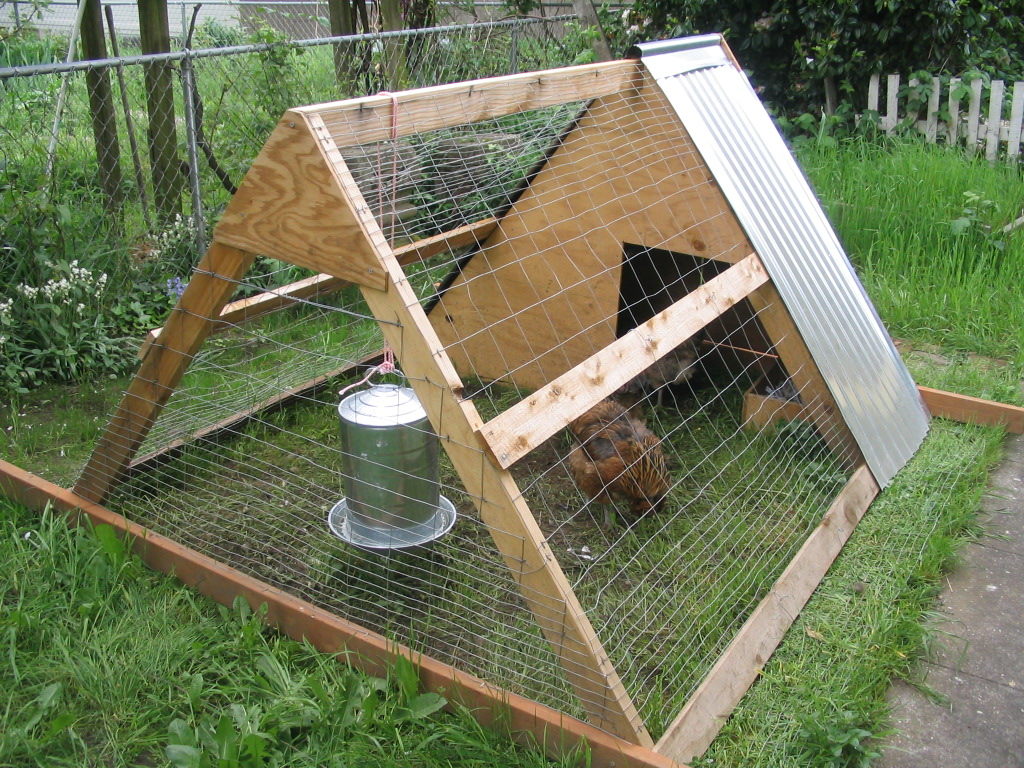
A home-built chicken tractor, without wheels, built to house a small number of hens.

A chicken tractor (sometimes called an ark) is a movable chicken coop lacking a floor. Chicken tractors may also house other kinds of poultry. Most chicken tractors are a lightly built A-frame which one person can drag about the yard. It may have wheels on one or both ends to make this easier.

== Use ==
Chicken tractors allow free ranging along with shelter, allowing chickens fresh forage such as grass, weeds and bugs (although these will quickly be stripped away if the tractor remains in the same place for too long), which widens their diet and lowers their feed needs. Unlike fixed coops, chicken tractors do not have floors so there is no need to clean them out. They echo a natural, symbiotic cycle of foraging through which the birds eat down vegetation, deposit fertilizing manure, then go on to a new area.

The term chicken tractor comes from the chickens performing many functions normally performed using a modern farm tractor: functions like digging and weeding the soil in preparation for planting trees or crops or fertilizing and weeding to enhance the growth of crops and trees already planted.

With chicken tractors flock owners can raise poultry in an extensive environment wherein the birds have access to fresh air, sunlight, forage and exercise, which caged birds in commercial coops do not have. With the coop on only a small area at any given time, the field has time to wholly regrow and more birds can be fed than if they were allowed to freely roam. A chicken tractor also gives some shelter from predators and weather. Moreover, hens lay eggs in nest boxes rather than hiding them in foliage.

== Environmental Impact of Using a Farmer Chicken Tractor ==
Chicken tractors are sometimes used in sustainable agriculture systems, where they may contribute to nutrient cycling by depositing manure directly onto pasture or cultivated land. This manure can add organic matter and nutrients to the soil, potentially reducing the need for synthetic fertilisers in some management systems.

The foraging behaviour of chickens within mobile enclosures may also assist in controlling certain weed seeds and insect populations, depending on stocking density and rotation frequency. By concentrating poultry activity in controlled areas and moving the enclosure regularly, nutrient distribution and vegetation impact can be managed across different parts of a site.

Mobile poultry systems are also associated with the reuse of animal waste within the same production area, forming part of closed-loop or low-input farming approaches in some small-scale and regenerative agricultural practices.

== See also ==
- Chickens as pets
- Permaculture
