= Free range =

Method of farming where animals can roam freely outdoors

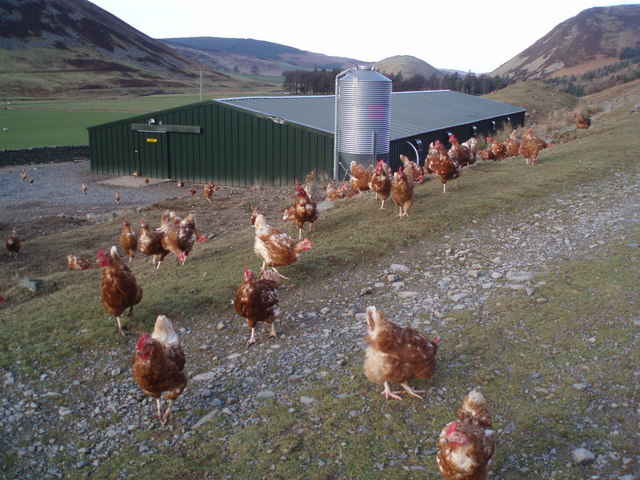
Commercial free range hens in Scotland

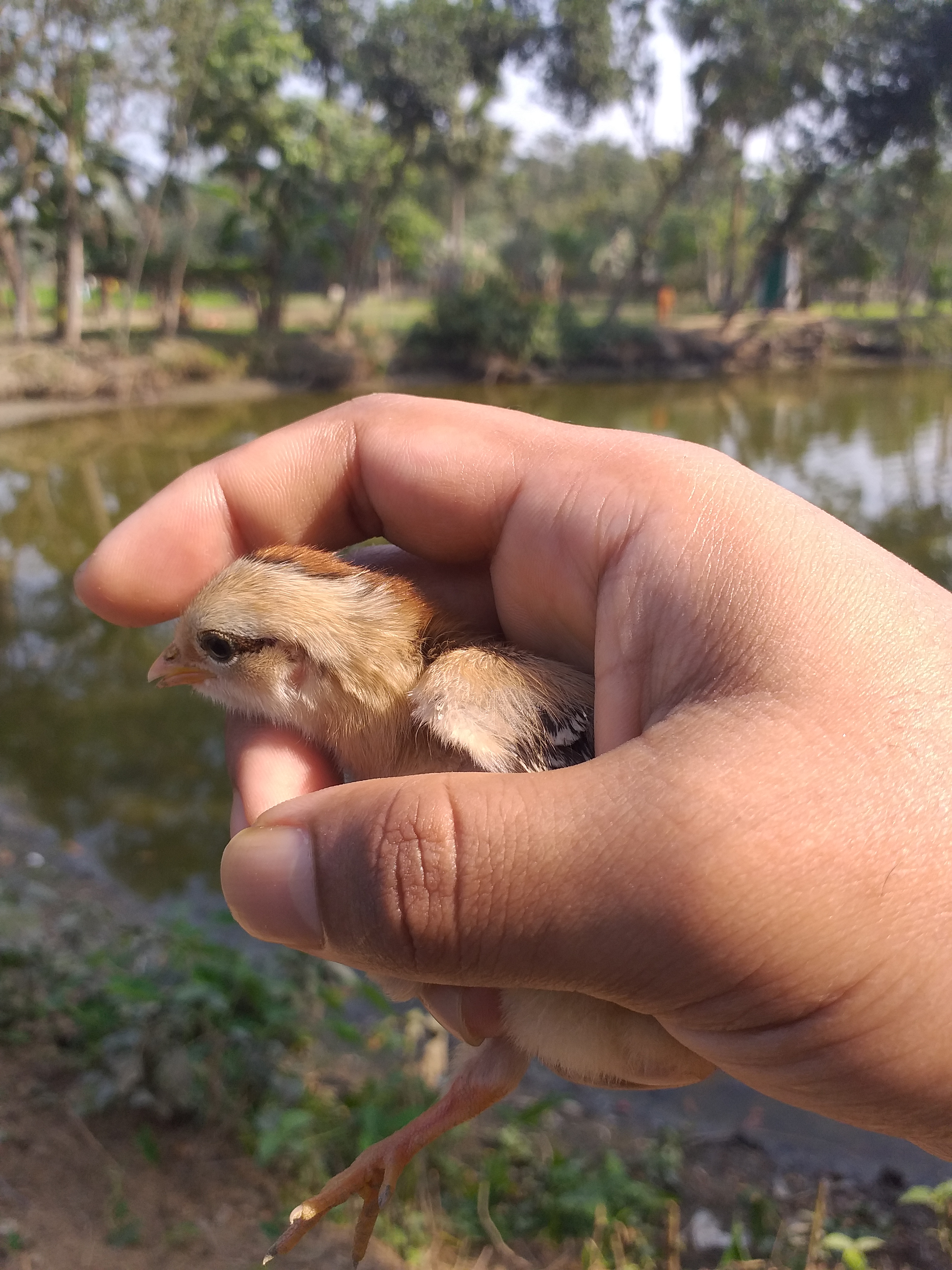
Baby free range chicken in the hand of a person in Ishwarganj Upazila, Mymensingh, Bangladesh

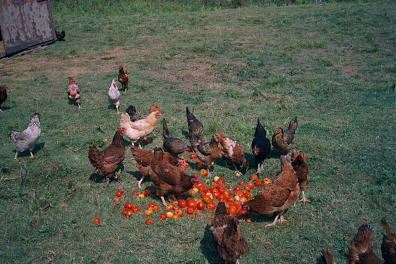
A small flock of mixed free-range chickens being fed outdoors

Free range denotes a method of farming husbandry where the animals can roam freely outdoors for at least part of the day, rather than being confined in an enclosure for 24 hours each day. On many farms, the outdoors ranging area is fenced, thereby technically making this an enclosure, however, free range systems usually offer the opportunity for the extensive locomotion and sunlight that is otherwise prevented by indoor housing systems. Free range may apply to meat, eggs or dairy farming.

The term is used in two senses that do not overlap completely: as a farmer-centric description of husbandry methods, and as a consumer-centric description of them. There is a diet where the practitioner only eats meat from free-range sources called ethical omnivorism.

In ranching, free-range livestock are permitted to roam without being fenced in, as opposed to intensive animal farming practices such as the concentrated animal feeding operation. In many agriculture-based economies, free-range livestock are quite common.

== History ==
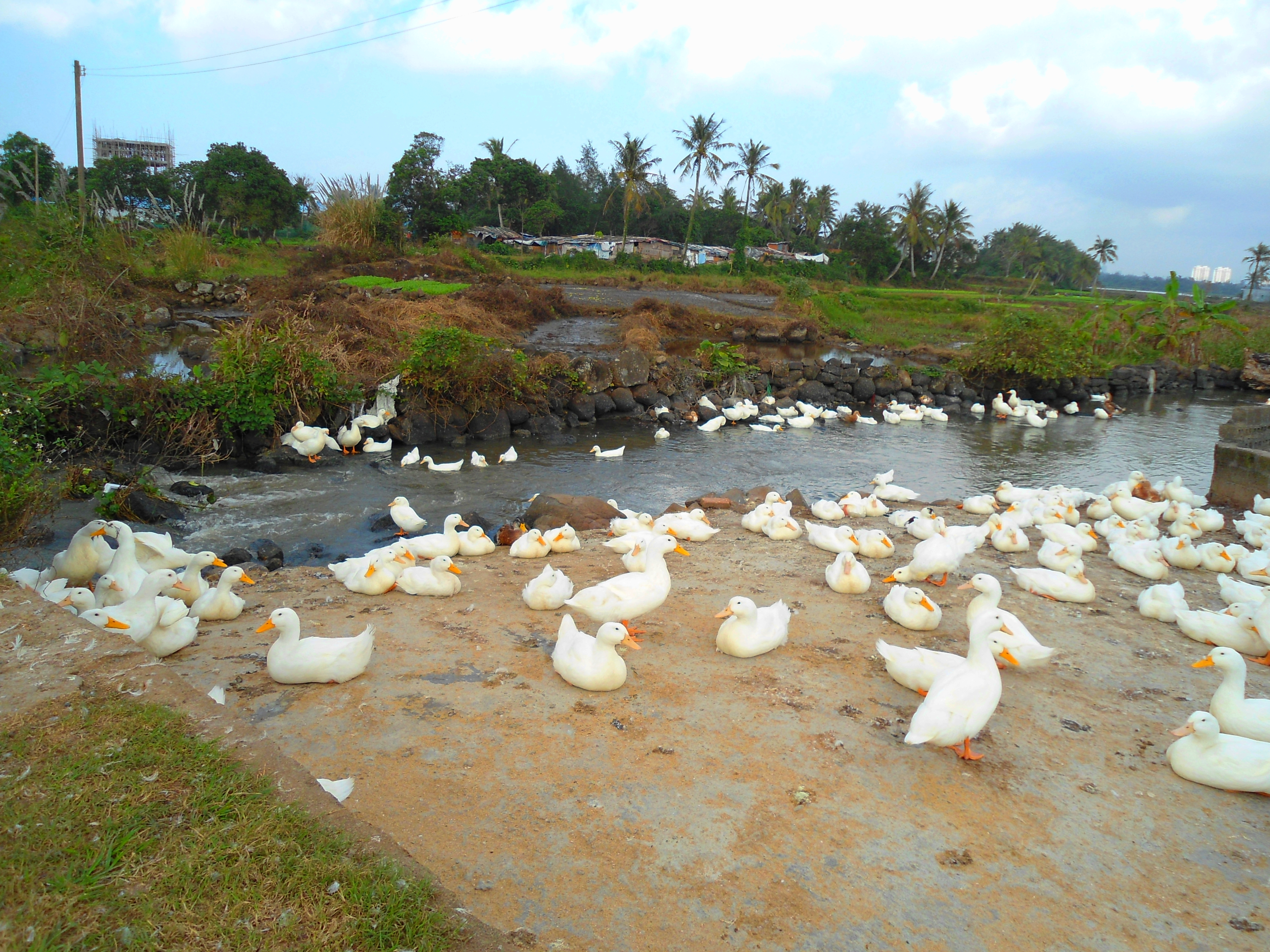
Free range ducks in Hainan Province, China

If one allows "free range" to include "herding", free range was a typical husbandry method at least until the development of barbed wire and chicken wire. The generally poor understanding of nutrition and diseases before the twentieth century made it difficult to raise many livestock species without giving them access to a varied diet, and the labor of keeping livestock in confinement and carrying all their feed to them was prohibitive except for high-profit animals such as dairy cattle.

In the case of poultry, free range was the dominant system until the discovery of vitamins A and D in the 1920s, which allowed confinement to be practised successfully on a commercial scale. Before that, green feed and sunshine (for the vitamin D) were necessary to provide the necessary vitamin content. Some large commercial breeding flocks were reared on pasture into the 1950s. Nutritional science resulted in the increased use of confinement for other livestock species in much the same way.

== Environmental impact ==
Extended grazing on open grasslands can stimulate plant growth that sequesters additional carbon dioxide. However, grass-fed cows generally grow more slowly and are smaller at slaughter compared to grain-fed cows. Because they take longer to reach market weight and convert feed into meat less efficiently, their total lifetime emissions—particularly methane—are typically higher. As a result, grass-fed beef tends to have a higher carbon footprint per kilogram than grain-fed beef. A study by Daniel Blaustein-Rejto and colleagues estimated that emissions from grass-fed beef were approximately 20% higher than those from grain-fed cattle.

Compared to caged hens, free-range hens produce fewer eggs and required more feed, which resulted in a carbon footprint around 16% higher per kilogram of egg.

== United States ==
In the United States, the Department of Agriculture free range regulations currently apply only to poultry and indicate that the animal has been allowed access to the outside. To be considered "free range," the poultry must have access to the outdoors for more than 51% of the animal's life. However, USDA regulations make no mention of the quality or size of the outside range. The Certified Humane Program offers third-party certification for producers who meet minimum standards, including providing access to grass pastures, traditional nests, and "dust areas to perform natural behaviors".

The term "free range" is mainly used as a marketing term rather than a husbandry term, meaning something on the order of, "low stocking density", "pasture-raised", "grass-fed", "old-fashioned", "humanely raised", etc.

There have been proposals to regulate USDA labeling of products as free range within the United States. As of 2017 what constitutes raising an animal "free range" is almost entirely decided by the producer of that product, and is frequently inconsistent with consumer ideas of what the term means.

=== Free-range poultry ===
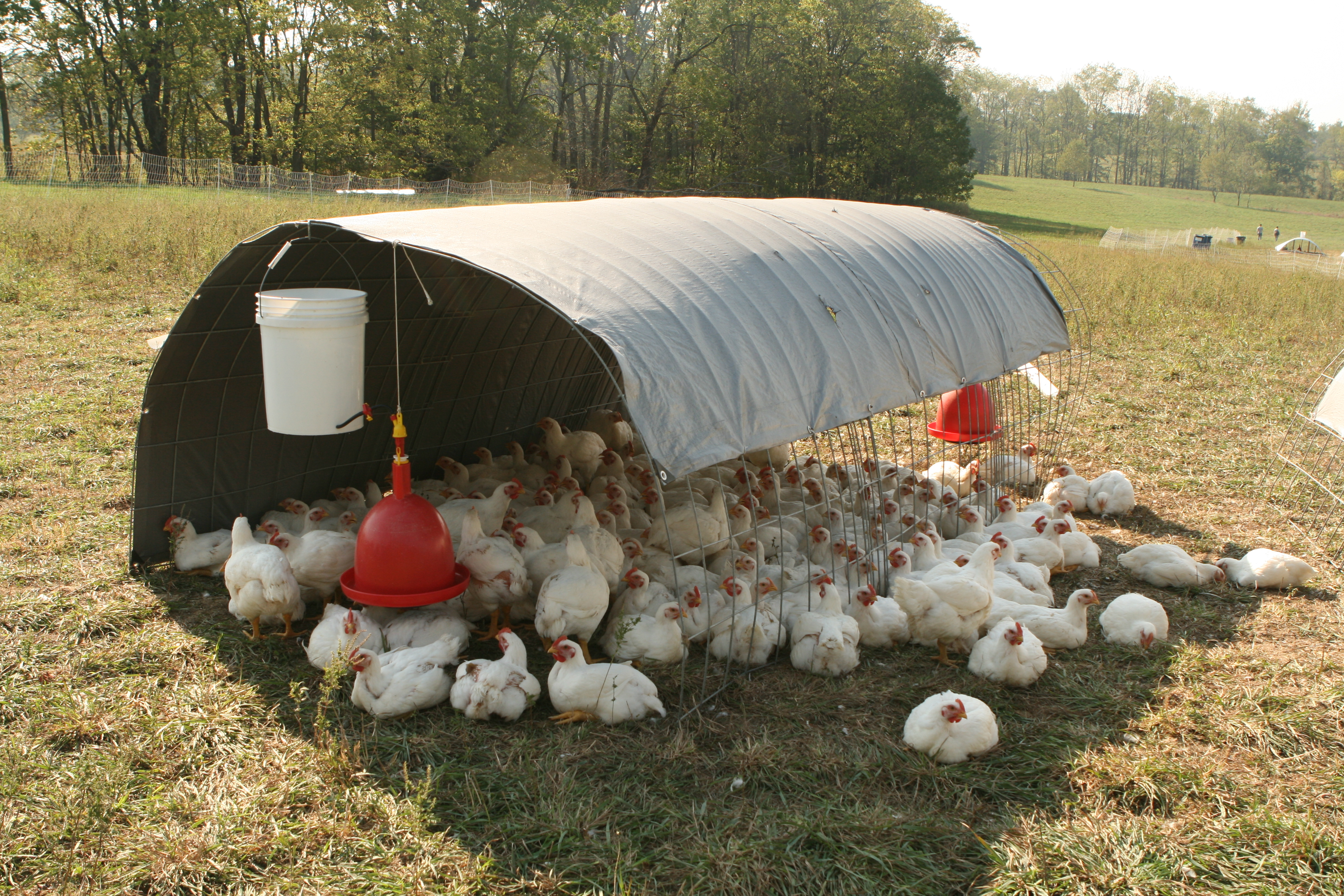
Free range meat chickens seek shade on a U.S. farm.

In poultry-keeping, "free range" is widely confused with yarding, which means keeping poultry in fenced yards. Yarding, as well as floorless portable chicken pens ("chicken tractors") may have some of the benefits of free-range livestock but, in reality, the methods have little in common with the free-range method.

A behavioral definition of free range is perhaps the most useful: "chickens kept with a fence that restricts their movements very little." This has practical implications. For example, according to Jull, "The most effective measure of preventing cannibalism seems to be to give the birds good grass range." De-beaking was invented to prevent cannibalism for birds not on free range, and the need for de-beaking can be seen as a litmus test for whether the chickens' environment is sufficiently "free-range-like".

The U.S. Department of Agriculture Food Safety and Inspection Service (FSIS) requires that chickens raised for their meat have access to the outside in order to receive the free-range certification. However, what qualifies as "access" is not defined. There is no requirement for access to pasture, and there may be access to only dirt or gravel. Free-range chicken eggs, however, have no legal definition in the United States. Likewise, free-range egg producers have no common standard on what the term means.

The broadness of "free range" in the U.S. has caused some people to look for alternative terms. "Pastured poultry" is a term promoted by farmer/author Joel Salatin for broiler chickens raised on grass pasture for all of their lives except for the initial brooding period. The Pastured Poultry concept is promoted by the American Pastured Poultry Producers' Association (APPPA), an organization of farmers raising their poultry using Salatin's principles. This term is not defined by the USDA and has no legal definition. To use a term like pasture-raised, producers must submit documentation to the FSIS of continuous free access to the outdoors, but do not need to include additional terminology to define pasture-raised on its label.

=== Free-range livestock ===
Traditional American usage equates "free range" with "unfenced", and with the implication that there was no herdsman keeping them together or managing them in any way. Legally, a free-range jurisdiction allowed livestock (perhaps only of a few named species) to run free, and the owner was not liable for any damage they caused. In such jurisdictions, people who wished to avoid damage by livestock had to fence them out; in others, the owners had to fence them in.

The U.S. Department of Agriculture (USDA) has no specific definition for "free-range" beef, pork, and other non-poultry products. All USDA definitions of "free-range" refer specifically to poultry.

In a December 2002 Federal Register notice and request for comments (67 Fed. Reg. 79552), the USDA's Agricultural Marketing Service proposed "minimum requirements for livestock and meat industry production/marketing claims". Many industry claim categories are included in the notice, including breed claims, antibiotic claims, and grain fed claims. "Free Range, Free Roaming, or Pasture Raised" would be defined as "livestock that have had continuous and unconfined access to pasture throughout their life cycle" with an exception for swine ("continuous access to pasture for at least 80% of their production cycle"). In a May 2006 Federal Register notice (71 Fed. Reg. 27662), the agency presented a summary and its responses to comments received in the 2002 notice, but only for the category "grass (forage) fed" which the agency stated was to be a category separate from "free range". Comments received for other categories, including "free range", are to be published in future Federal Register editions.

== European Union ==
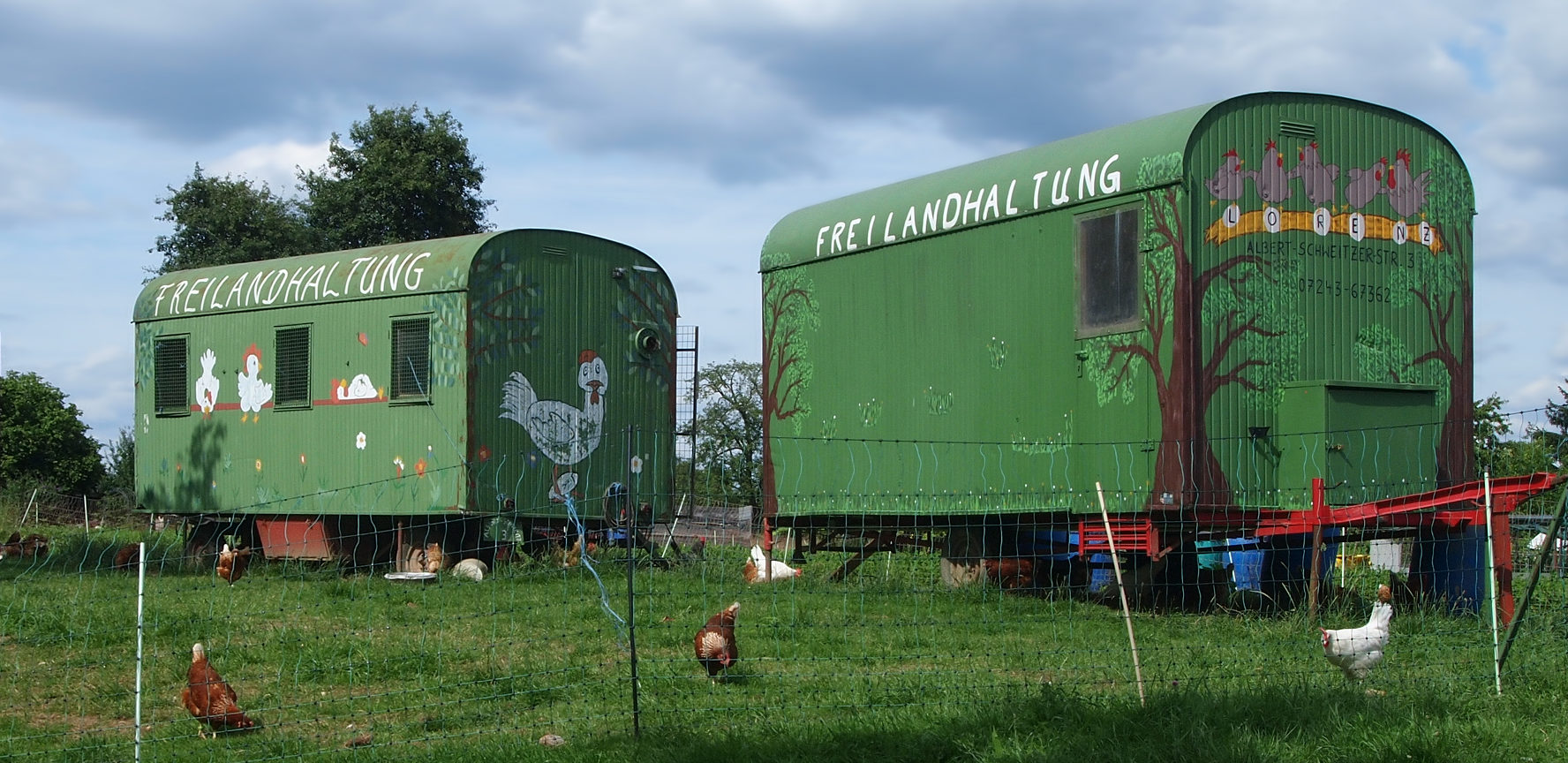
Small-scale free range farming in the Northern Black Forest

The European Union regulates marketing standards for egg farming which specifies the following (cumulative) minimum conditions for the free-range method:

- hens have continuous daytime access to open-air runs, except in the case of temporary restrictions imposed by veterinary authorities,
- the open-air runs to which hens have access is mainly covered with vegetation and not used for other purposes except for orchards, woodland and livestock grazing if the latter is authorised by the competent authorities,
- the open-air runs must at least satisfy the conditions specified in Article 4(1)(3)(b)(ii) of Directive 1999/74/EC whereby the maximum stocking density is not greater than 2500 hens per hectare of ground available to the hens or one hen per 4 square metres (43 sq ft) at all times and the runs are not extending beyond a radius of 150 metres (490 ft) from the nearest pophole of the building; an extension of up to 350 metres (1,150 ft) from the nearest pophole of the building is permissible provided that a sufficient number of shelters and drinking troughs within the meaning of that provision are evenly distributed throughout the whole open-air run with at least four shelters per hectare.

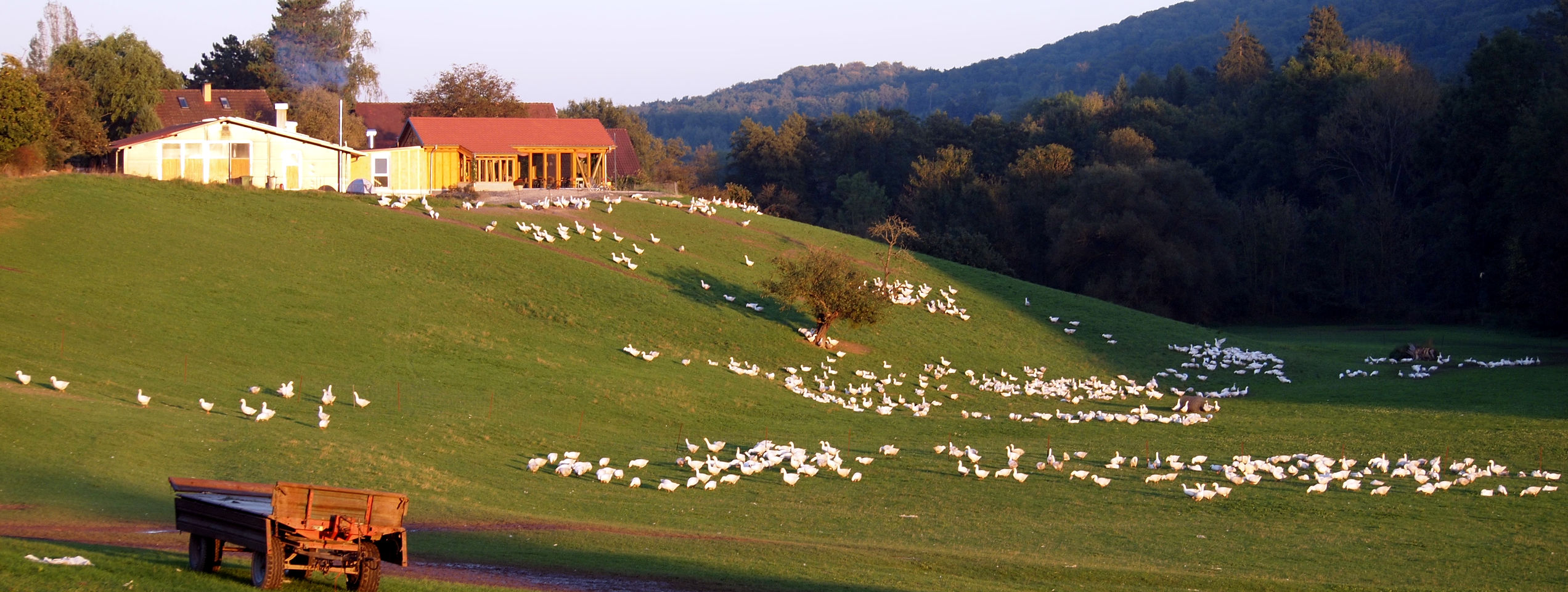
Free range geese in Germany

Otherwise, egg farming in EU is classified into 4 categories: Organic (ecological), Free Range, Barn, and Cages.) The mandatory labelling on the egg shells attributes a number (which is the first digit on the label) to each of these categories: 0 for Organic, 1 for Free Range, 2 for Barn and 3 for Cages.

There are EU regulations about what free-range means for laying hens and broilers (meat chickens) as indicated above. However, there are no EU regulations for free-range pork, so pigs could be indoors for some of their lives. In order to be classified as free-range, animals must have access to the outdoors for at least part of their lives.

== United Kingdom ==
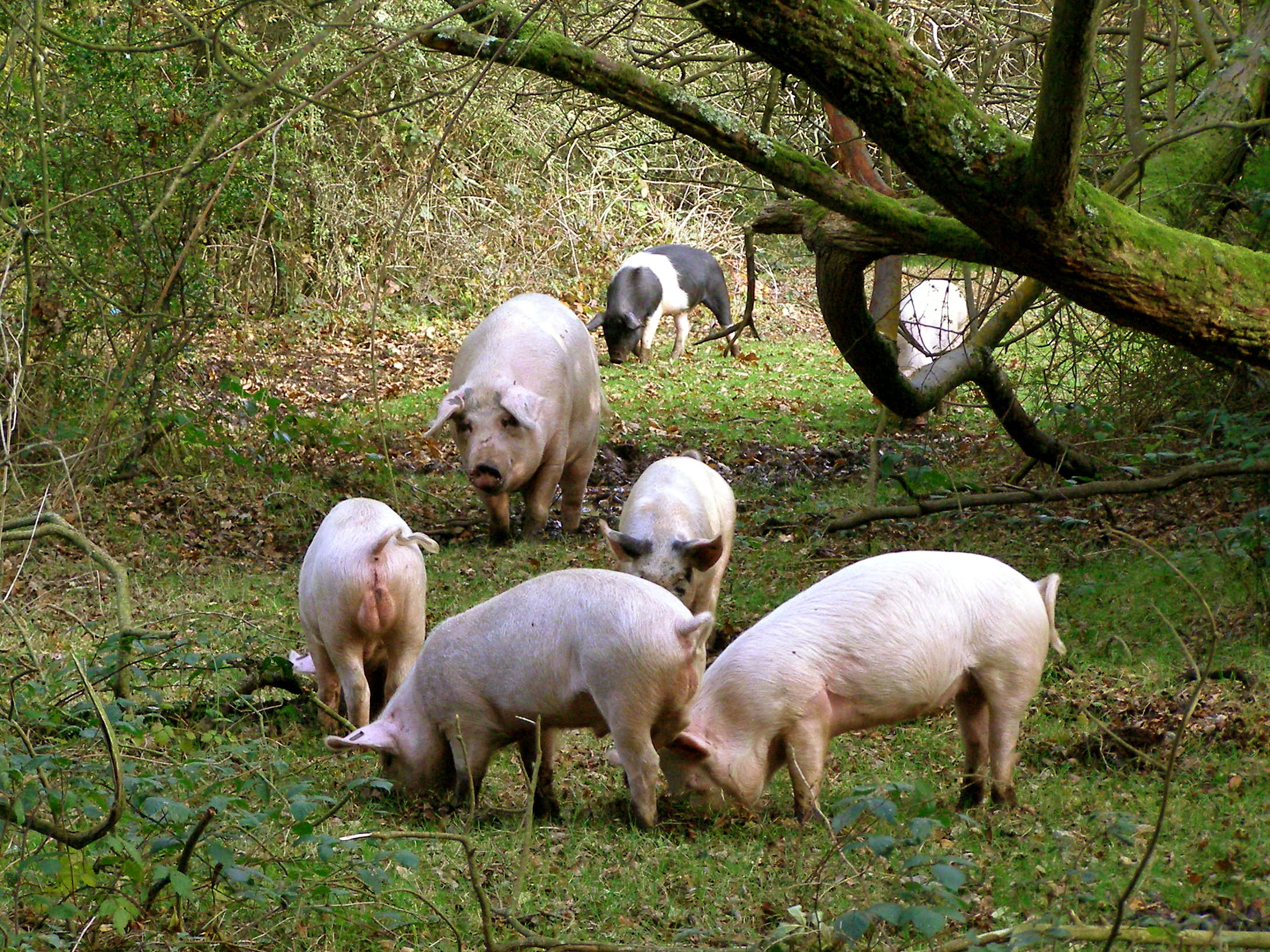
Free range pigs in England

Pigs: Free-range pregnant sows are kept in groups and they are often provided with straw for bedding, rooting and chewing. Around 40% of UK sows are kept free-range outdoors and farrow in huts on their range.

Egg laying hens: Cage-free egg production includes barn, free-range and organic systems. The UK is the largest free-range egg producer in the Europe. Free-range systems are the most popular of the non-cage alternatives, accounting for around 57% of all eggs, compared to 2% in barns and 2% organic. In free-range systems, hens are housed to a similar standard as the barn or aviary.

Free-range rearing of pullets: Free range rearing of pullets for egg-laying is now being pioneered in the UK by various poultry rearing farms. In these systems, the pullets are allowed outside from as young as 4 weeks of age, rather than the conventional systems where the pullets are reared in barns and allowed out at 16 weeks of age.

Meat chickens: Free-range broilers are reared for meat and are allowed access to an outdoor range for at least 8 hours each day. RSPCA standards state that in order for chickens to be free range, there must not be more than 13 chickens per square meter. Free-range broiler systems use slower-growing breeds of chicken to improve welfare, meaning they reach slaughter weight at 16 weeks of age rather than 5–6 weeks of age in standard rearing systems.

Turkeys: Free-range turkeys have continuous access to an outdoor range during the daytime. The range should be largely covered in vegetation and allow more space. Access to fresh air and daylight means better eye and respiratory health. The turkeys are able to exercise and exhibit natural behaviour resulting in stronger, healthier legs. Free-range systems often use slower-growing breeds of turkey.

Free range dairy: Farms supplying milk under the free range dairy brand abide by the pasture promise, meaning the cows will have access to pasture land to graze for a minimum of 180 days and nights a year. There is evidence to suggest that milk from grass contains higher levels of fats such as omega-3 and conjugated linoleic acid (CLA). Additionally free range dairy is giving consumers more choice as to where their milk comes from. Free range dairy provides the consumer with reassurance that the milk they drink has come from cows with the freedom to roam and can graze in their natural habitat.

== Australia ==
Australian standards in relation to free-range production are largely espoused in third-party certification trade marks due to the absence of any significant legally binding legislation. A number of certification bodies are utilised by rearers to identify their products with a particular level of animal welfare standards. In events where producers do not choose to use a certified trade mark and merely state that their product is 'free range', the producer is bound by consumer expectations and perceptions of what constitutes free range. Producers are generally thought to be bound to Model Codes of Practice of Animal Welfare published by the CSIRO, and in some states this forms part of legislation.

=== Egg laying hens ===
In Australia, three farming methods for the production of eggs are utilised. In 2011, traditional cage (or battery) eggs accounted for 42% of value, barn-laid eggs account for 10% of value, free-range eggs accounted for 44% of value, and organic eggs accounted for 4% of value. Increased demand for free range eggs due to customer concerns over animal welfare has led to a number of different standards developing in relation to three core welfare measures – indoor stocking density, outdoor stocking density, and beak trimming. The Model Code of Practice recommends practices for free range farming with the following standards:

- Maximum stocking densities indoors of 30 kg/m^{2}, equivalent to about 14–15 birds per square metre.
- Maximum outdoor stocking density of 1500 birds per hectare, although this can be increased with rotation onto fresh pasture
- Access to the outdoor range for a minimum of 8 hours per day, except in adverse weather conditions
- 2 metres worth of popholes per 1,000 birds for access to the range
- Beak trimming is permitted, and to be undertaken by an accredited operator

The above standards are not always met, and on some occasions producers may want more ethical standards. As such, certified trade marks play a significant role in the determining of what constitutes free range. The key certifications used for layer hens in Australia include the following:

Egg Corp Assured is the weakest standard, set by the industry peak group and largely based on the Model Code of Practice. Egg Corp Assured differs in that it interprets the outdoor stocking density figure as largely irrelevant to welfare. Egg Corp Assured has been known to certify farms running up to 44,000 birds per hectare outdoors, far in excess of recommendations. Like the Model Code of practice, beak trimming is allowed and indoor densities run up to 15 birds per square metre.

RSPCA Approved Farming is a standard that can be applied to both barn-laid and free-range egg producers. Farms using this certification must have an indoor density of 9 birds per square metre indoors on slats, or 7 birds per square metre indoors in a deep-litter system. The standards dictate a maximum outdoor density of 1500 per hectare without rotation, or 2500 birds per hectare with rotation, and beak trimming is allowed.

Free Range Egg & Poultry Australia (FREPA) standards provides a sliding scale for indoor density, with 10 birds per square metre allowed only in enclosures housing less than 1000 birds, and 6 birds per square metre the maximum for barns with over 4000 birds. Nothing is said in the standards about outdoor density, thus it is assumed that farmers must meet the standards under the Model Code. Beak trimming is allowed under this certification.

Humane Choice True Free Range standards are some of the most sound as far as animal welfare is concerned. Beak trimming or any other mutilation is not permitted, perches must be provided, and maximum flock numbers cannot be greater than 2500 per barn. The outdoor stocking density is 1500 birds per hectare, and the indoor density is 5 birds per square metre.

Australian Certified Organic Standards include criteria on feed content and the use of pesticides in addition to animal welfare requirements. The indoor density is a maximum of 8 birds per square metre, although most operators under this standard list their density as 5 birds per square metre. The outdoor density is 1000 birds per hectare, and beak trimming is not permitted.

=== Chicken meat ===
In Australia, free range and organic chicken accounts for about 16.6% of value in the poultry market. This percentage is expected to grow to up to 25% in the next 5 years. No meat birds are raised in cages in Australia. There are three main certification trademarks in this market.

Free Range Egg & Poultry Australia (FREPA) standards are those in which most supermarket brands of free range chicken meat are accredited under. These standards require indoor stocking densities of up to 30 kg/m^{2} indoors (about 15 birds per square metre), and beak trimming is not permitted. Outdoor stocking density is not stated, but it is understood that the outdoor range must be at a minimum 1.5 times the floor area of inside the barn.

RSPCA Approved Farming standards for free range require an indoor stocking density of about 17 birds per square metre, and outdoor densities of up to 17 birds per square metre. No beak trimming is allowed under this system.

Australian Certified Organic standards dictate a maximum indoor stocking density of up to 12 birds per square metre indoors, and 2500 birds per hectare outdoors. These standards require perches, and prevent large, conventional broiler sheds.

== See also ==
- Ethical consumerism – Type of consumer activism
- Free-range eggs – Type of egg produced from outdoor poultry
- Grass-fed beef – Methods of providing dietary sustenance to cattle
- Organic eggs – Egg production through organic means
- Organic livestock farming – Form of food production
- Chickens as pets – Keeping chickens as personal pets
- Grazing – Feeding livestock on forage
- Ethical omnivorism – Omnivorism that is selective of sourcing
- Yarding – Provision of a fenced yard in poultry keeping
