= Pete & Gerry's =

American egg producer and distributor

- Type: Private
- Industry: Food production
- Founded: 1995 (as Pete & Gerry's Organic Eggs)
- Headquarters: Salem, New Hampshire, United States
- Key people: Tom Flocco (CEO)
- Products: Eggs, Yogurt
- Brands: Pete & Gerry's; Nellie's Free Range; Pillars
- Owner: Butterfly Equity
- Website: www.peteandgerrys.com

Pete & Gerry's (legally Pete and Gerry's Organics, LLC) is an American egg producer and distributor. The company markets organic, free-range, and pasture-raised eggs under brands including Pete & Gerry's Organic and Nellie's Free Range, and also sells a drinkable yogurt under the Pillars brand. In 2003 it became the first U.S. egg producer certified under the Certified Humane program, and in 2013, the company became the first egg producer to obtain B Corporation certification.

== History ==
The company began as a family farming operation in Monroe, New Hampshire, that was owned by Les Ward, who started an egg farm after serving in the US Armed Services during World War II. Les's daughter, Carol, and her husband, Gerry Laflamme, operated the egg farm with Carol's cousin, Pete Stanton. The name "Pete & Gerry's" derived from these two men.

In the late 1990s, the family converted the farm to organic and free-range production, marketing the eggs as Pete & Gerry's Organic Eggs. Jesse Laflamme, son of Carol and Gerry, returned to the business after graduating from Bates College in 2000 and later led its expansion, taking over leadership as the third generation of the family. In 2002, the company launched a conventionally fed free-range egg brand, Nellie's.

In 2013, Pete and Gerry's became the first egg producer in the world to achieve Certified B-Corporation status.

In May 2021, Butterfly Equity, a Los Angeles–based private equity firm, acquired a majority stake in the company; Jesse Laflamme retained an ownership position and a board role.

Under Butterfly's ownership the company made multiple acquisitions. In early 2025 Pete & Gerry's acquired Pasture Brands Holdings from Benford Capital Partners, adding the Iowa-based egg supplier Farmers Hen House and the Pillars drinkable yogurt brand.

== Brands and products ==
The company's leading product line is Certified Humane organic free-range eggs. In 2023, Pete & Gerry's expanded into the pasture-raised egg category with the launch of a Certified Humane Pasture Raised product line.

In 2018, Pete & Gerry's introduced a hard-boiled egg product sold in resealable pouches, described in trade coverage as the first Certified Humane organic hard-boiled egg brought to market in the United States. The company also sells an organic liquid egg white product in cartons.

In 2025, it introduced an organic pasture-raised line combining USDA organic feed standards with expanded access to outdoor pastures.

Nellie's Free Range, launched in 2002, is marketed as a Certified Humane free-range egg brand. In 2020, the company settled consumer litigation related to free-range labeling.

The company's portfolio also includes Pillars, a high-protein drinkable Greek yogurt brand founded in 2016 by Eric Bonin. It was acquired through the 2025 purchase of Pasture Brands.

== Sourcing and certifications ==
Pete & Gerry's contracts with family farms rather than operating large company-owned flocks and limits the size of partner farms. The number of partner farms has grown over time, from between 60 to 130 in the 2010s to about 300 after the 2025 Farmers Hen House acquisition. Today, the company reports working with more than 350 farms across 18 states.

The company became the first U.S. egg producer certified under the Certified Humane program in 2003, and in 2013 it reported becoming the first egg producer to obtain B Corporation certification.

== See also ==
- Organic egg production
- Free-range eggs
- Pastured poultry
- Humane Farm Animal Care
- Vital Farms
- The Happy Egg Company
