= Free-range eggs =

Type of egg produced from outdoor poultry

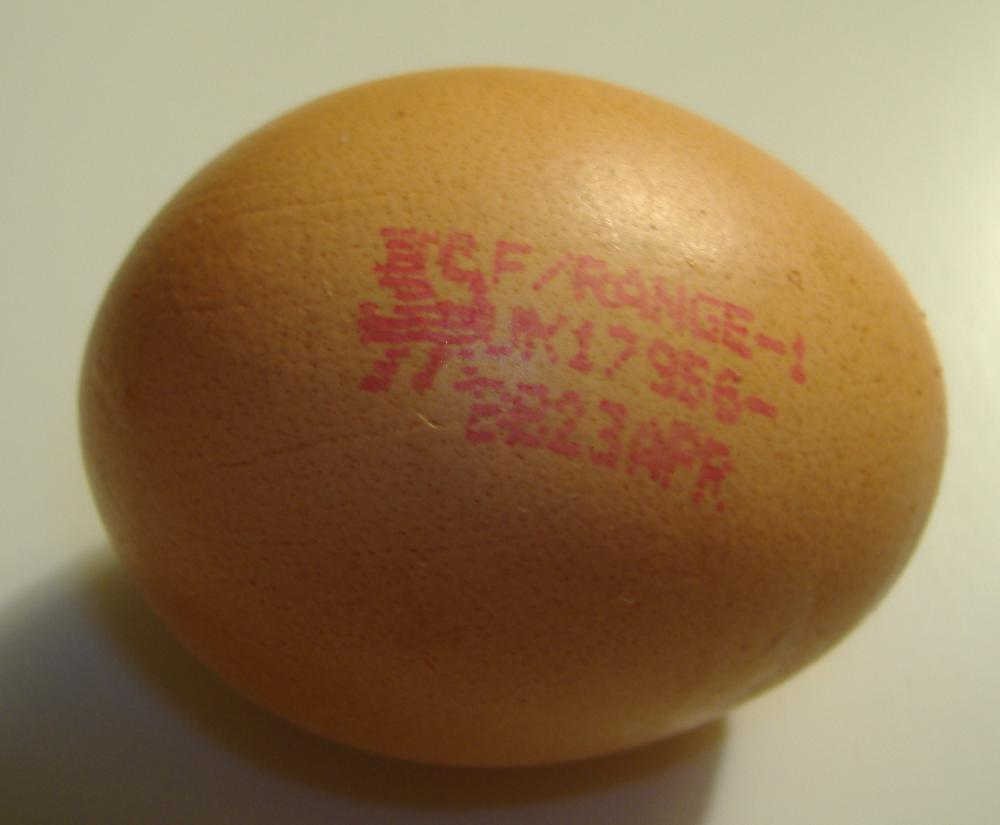
A free-range egg purchased in the United Kingdom

Free-range eggs are eggs produced from birds that may be permitted outdoors. The term "free-range" may be used differently depending on the country and the relevant laws.

Eggs from hens that are only indoors might also be labelled cage-free, barn, barn-roaming or aviary, following the animal happiness certification policies, also known as "happy chickens" or "happy eggs". This is different from birds that are reared in systems labelled as battery cages or furnished cages.

== Legal definition ==
Legal standards defining free range can be different or non-existent depending on the country. Various watchdog organizations, governmental agencies, and industry groups adhere to differing criteria regarding what constitutes a "free-range" and "cage-free" status. In Massachusetts, there was a proposal to ban the sale of meat or eggs from caged animals, regardless of where they were raised. This potential shift from caged to cage-free production has raised concerns among egg industry groups. They worry that it will lead to a significant increase in egg prices, making them unaffordable for many consumers and potentially harming the egg industry

=== United States ===
The United States Department of Agriculture (USDA) via Food Safety and Inspection Service (FSIS) provides a 2024 Guideline document detailing documentation requirements to substantiate claims like "Free Range".

FSIS Guideline on Substantiating Animal-Raising or Environment-Related Labeling Claims - 2024

Egg producers must provide documentation that show the labels are not misleading. "Free Range" provides additional requirements such as

"...housing conditions for the birds and demonstrate continuous, free access to the outside throughout their normal growing cycle (and grazing season)"

The guidelines do not:

- Restrict Chick culling
- Specify the substrate for the outdoor environment
- Clarify the safety of the outside environment be safe for the hens
- Specify the quantity, size, locations, or the amount of time hens have access to the outside environment
- Specify the living/safety conditions of the poultry housing or coop

Many producers choose to label their eggs as cage-free in addition to, or instead of, free-range. Recently, US egg labels have expanded to include the term "barn-roaming", to more accurately describe the source of those eggs that are laid by hens which cannot range freely, but are confined to a barn instead of a more restrictive cage.

==== Third-party certifications ====
The guidelines published in 2024 also "strongly encourages" the use of third-party certifications due to limits on FSIS jurisdiction. Approval then relies on the third-party's certification, the third-parties logo and website on the product, and the product claims to be defined on the third-party website provided.

"FSIS strongly encourages use of third-party certification to substantiate these claims due to limits on FSIS jurisdiction. The Agency evaluates each third-party certification program to assess its suitability for substantiating animal-raising or environment-related claims on labels.

Alternatively, establishments certified by a third-party organization that posts the standards used to define the claim on its website do not need to include a statement that fully explains the claim on the label. If the living or raising conditions claim is certified by a third-party organization, LPDS will approve the label bearing the claim only if it includes the certifying entity’s name, website address, and logo (when the organization has a logo). An asterisk or other symbol must connect the claim to this information."

Some examples of third-party certifications are:

- Certified Humane
- Animal Welfare Approved by AGW

==== Debate ====
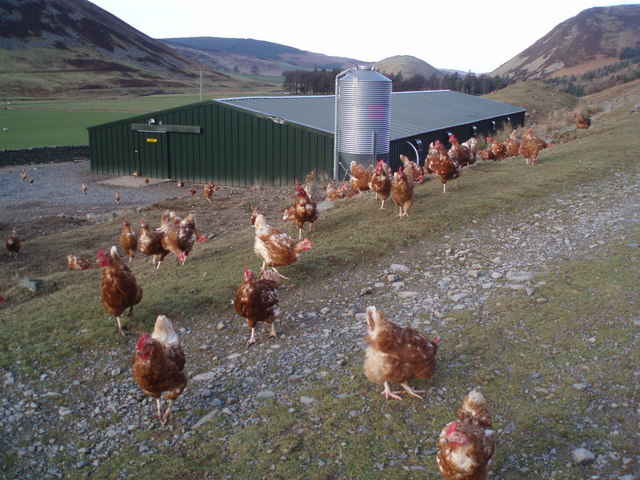
Commercial free-range hens outdoors

Cage-free eggs have been a major cause of debate in the US. In 2015, there was an initiative proposed in Massachusetts that would ban the sale of in-state meat or eggs "from caged animals raised anywhere in the nation". This shift from caged to cage-free is concerning for egg industry groups because they believe that this will cause the price of eggs to increase to the point that consumers cannot afford to buy them, thereby causing a decline in the egg industry overall. Animal welfare advocates argue that costs will not change as drastically as industry groups are expecting and that the price of eggs will remain almost the same because the housing of the birds does not make a huge difference in cost. Egg industry groups are making an effort to show or "educate lawmakers, voters, and consumers about the merits and cost-effectiveness of cage use". Local farmers and producers say that the shift will occur if that is what consumers want; they will adapt to having birds in or out of cages. Not only are there debates between the egg industry and animal welfare advocates, but people are also debating whether this issue has to be handled by the federal government or the industry.

==== Growth ====
The popularity of cage-free eggs in the United States has significantly increased in recent years. In 2012, approximately 5% of U.S. egg-laying hens were kept in cage-free systems. As of March 2024, this figure had risen to 40%. While cage-free systems are not without their challenges, the industry appears to be transitioning towards this model as the dominant standard. Several U.S. states have enacted or are considering legislation banning the sale of eggs from conventionally caged hens. California, for instance, has already implemented such a ban. Major industry players, such as Cal-Maine Foods, the largest egg producer in the U.S., are investing heavily in cage-free production. Cal-Maine has allocated $40 million to expand its cage-free operations and plans to build five new facilities to house 1 million cage-free hens by the summer of 2025.

=== European Union ===
In the European Union, cage-free egg production includes barns, free-range, organic (in the UK, systems must be free-range if they are to be labelled as organic) and aviary systems. Non-cage systems may be single or multi-tier (up to four levels), with or without outdoor access. In the UK, free-range systems are the most popular of the non-cage alternatives, accounting for around 44% of all eggs in 2013, whereas barns and organic eggs together accounted for 5%.

In free-range systems, hens are housed to a standard similar to that of a barn or aviary.

The European Union Council Directive 1999/74/EC stipulates that from 1 January 2007 (1 January 2012 for newly built or rebuilt systems), non-cage systems must provide the following:

- A maximum stocking density of nine hens/m^{2} of "usable" space (units in production on or before 3 August 1999 could continue with a stocking density up to 12 hens/m^{2} until 31 December 2011)
- If more than one level is used, a height of at least 45 cm between the levels
- One nest for every seven hens (or 1 m^{2} of nest space for every 120 hens if group nests are used)
- Litter (e.g. wood shavings) covering at least one-third of the floor surface, providing at least 250 cm^{2} of littered area per hen
- 15 cm of perching space per hen.

In addition to these requirements, free-range systems must also provide the following:

- One hectare of outdoor range for every 2,500 hens (equivalent to 4 m^{2} per hen; at least 2.5 m^{2} per hen must be available at any one time if the rotation of the outdoor range is practiced)
- Continuous access during the day to this open-air range, which must be "mainly covered with vegetation"
- Several popholes extend along the entire building length, providing at least 2 m of opening for every 1,000 hens.

Case studies of free-range systems for laying hens across the EU, carried out by Compassion in World Farming, demonstrate how breed choice and preventive management practices can enable farmers to successfully use non beak-trimmed birds.

=== Australia ===
In 2012, Australian Eggs, the body for the industry, tried to register a free-range trademark allowing 20,000 hens per hectare on the range. This sparked a major discussion between large producers, small producers, animal welfare groups, and consumer rights groups. The trademark application was withdrawn after the Australian Competition & Consumer Commission commented that the "proposed standards may mislead consumers about the nature of eggs described as 'free range'" in its Initial Assessment of the application.

There is a voluntary code, which covers the basic standards of husbandry for physiological and behavioural needs of poultry, that allows for 1,500 layer hens per hectare. However, the code also states that "any higher bird density is acceptable only when regular rotation of birds onto fresh range areas occurs". The voluntary code is under review and due to be consulted upon.

The Queensland government approved an increase in free-range layer hen stocking densities in July 2013. The maximum number of hens per hectare was increased from 1,500 to 10,000.

In March 2016, Australian ministers voted in new national standards for the definition of free-range. The new standards allow for up to 10,000 birds per hectare, with no requirement for the hens to actually go outside. Choice, Australia's largest non-profit consumer organisation believes Australia's consumer affairs ministers made the decision to put the interests of large-scale Australian egg producers ahead of the needs of consumers.

In April 2017, the Australian Government finalised the law and decided to mandate a maximum of 10,000 hens per hectare in outdoor grazing areas, to which the hens must have "regular and meaningful" access. Currently, the most popular free range accreditation schemes mandating roaming space at or below the standard set by the EU for its members, are the Free Range Farmers Association (750 hens per hectare), Humane Choice (1,500 hens per hectare) and Australian Certified Organic (2,500 hens per hectare under pasture rotation). In July 2017, Snowdale was fined a record amount of $1.05m (including legal costs) for falsely advertising that its eggs were 'free range'. This was substantially larger than the fines imposed upon Derodi, Holland Farms, Pirovic or Darling Downs Fresh Eggs; set at either $300,000 or $250,000.

== Cost ==
Based on data in the European Commission's socio-economic report published in 2004, (prior to battery cages being banned in the EU) it cost €0.66 to produce 12 battery eggs, €0.82 to produce 12 barn eggs and €0.98 to produce 12 free-range eggs. This means that in 2004, one free-range egg cost 2.6 cents more to produce than a battery egg, and a barn egg cost 1.3 cents more to produce than a battery egg. The Commission's report concludes that, if costs were to increase by 20%, which it says is the type of percentage increase in terms of variable costs that producers are likely to face as a result of switching to free-range, the industry will potentially suffer a loss of producer surplus of €354 million (EU-25). The margins achieved by producers for barn and free-range eggs are appreciably higher than those that were available for battery eggs. The Commission's socio-economic report shows that margins for free-range eggs were around twice as high as those for battery eggs.

== Animal welfare ==
Many animal welfare advocates, including the Humane Society of the United States, maintain that cage-free and free-range eggs constitute a considerable improvement for laying hens. This has led to the adoption of a cage-free eggs standard by most major food companies in the United States, although in 2017, it was estimated that cage-free eggs represented only 10% of all produced. Pundits and food commentators have described the 2016 shift toward cage-free eggs across the food industry as a "bold decision" and historic shift. Several investigations, particularly by the animal rights group Direct Action Everywhere, have raised doubts about to what degree cage-free farms are an improvement for laying hens. An investigation of a cage-free Costco facility in late 2016 purported to find cannibalism from the birds attacking each other, and concluded that neither caged nor cage-free facilities offered laying hens positive lives.

== Misconceptions ==
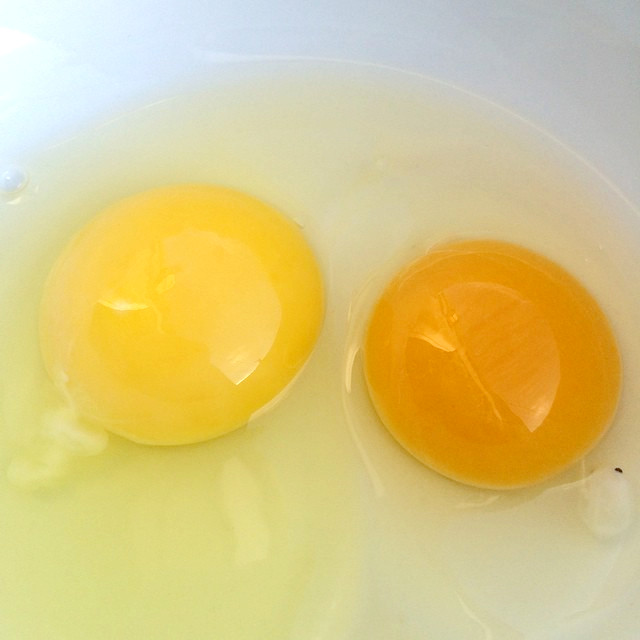
Photograph of two hen egg yolks, one from a commercial egg operation and one from a free-range backyard hen. The yolk of the backyard egg is bright orange.

Free-range eggs may be broader in definition and have more of an orange colour to their yolks owing to the abundance of greens and insects in the birds' diet if actually allowed substantial time outdoors to roam. These are also known as pasture-raised eggs. However, an orange yolk is not guaranteed to be from a free-range hen. Feed additives such as marigold petal meal, dried algae and alfalfa meal can be used to colour the yolks.

Contrary to popular belief, in the United States free-range regulations do not necessarily require that hens spend substantial time outdoors, only that the hens "have access to the outdoors". This access may be for very brief periods and the outside area may be small and sparse. Stocking densities indoors are often high, and many hens may stay inside as dominant hens often prevent the others from having access to the outside yard.

== Nutritional content ==
Differences in age, strain, and nutrition of the hens make it exceedingly difficult to draw scientific conclusions about the effects of housing systems on the quality of the eggs. Consumer perceptions of these alternative systems delivering a better product are then scientifically unjustified in terms of there being any nutritional difference. A 2011 research study carried out in North Carolina compared free-range and conventional caged eggs for fatty acids, cholesterol, vitamins A and E, finding higher fat content in free-range eggs, and no significant difference in cholesterol and vitamin levels. Vitamin D in eggs have been observed to increase up to 4 times in hens that have exposure to sunlight, compared to hens that are kept away from sunlight. Another research suggests that grass fed hens can produce eggs that are rich in (n−3) fatty acids, without adverse oxidative effects. Some other non peer-reviewed studies have found evidence for nutritional benefit of free-range eggs.

== Retailers ==
Several major retailers have a policy of selling only free-range eggs or not selling battery-cage eggs. Some retailers apply this policy to eggs in their shells and eggs used in baked goods and processed products such as ready-made meals, quiches, and ice cream. range shell eggs, and uses only free-range eggs in their processed products and ready-made meals.

As of 1 January 2007 (with one minor exception), all Austrian supermarkets no longer sell battery eggs. Many retailers in the Netherlands, including Albert Heijn and Schuitema (subsidiaries of Ahold), Laurus (including Edah, Konmar and Super de Boer), Dirk van den Broek (including Bas van der Heijden and Digros), Aldi and Lidl sell only free-range shell eggs; however the free-range eggs that are sold in Aldi and Lidl do not meet some country's recommendations for the production of free-range eggs. Three Belgian supermarkets: Makro, Colruyt and Lidl, no longer sell battery eggs. The Commission's report states that Sweden's move away from conventional battery cages has been aided by the decision of the four largest retailers (who, between them, account for 98–99% of the Swedish retail market) to stop stocking conventional battery eggs. U.S. food suppliers Aramark and Unilever have announced they intend to buy only cage-free eggs, but as of 2013 there are not enough available to supply them.

In Australia, free-range eggs sold in Aldi and Lidl do not meet the CSIRO]'s Model Code recommendation of 1,500 hens per hectare. In March 2016, Australian ministers voted in new standards for the definition of free-range. The new standards allow for up to 10,000 birds per hectare, with no requirement for the hens to actually go outside. Choice, Australia's largest non-profit consumer organisation believes Australia's consumer affairs ministers made the decision to put the interests of large-scale Australian egg producers ahead of the needs of consumers. A group called PROOF (standing for Pasture Raised On Open Fields) is now in the process of developing an accreditation scheme that will see the term "pastured" start appearing on cartons. The guidelines for PROOF's pastured eggs allow for a maximum stocking density of 1500 birds per hectare (in line with the CSIRO Model Code) and require that hens be able to range freely in open fields or paddocks. So far, PROOF has 12 licensed egg farms in Australia, with another eight in the pipeline.

== Environmental impact ==
Free range eggs carry an environmental cost. This is mainly because in free range egg production systems, the habitat is difficult to control and the resource required to produce eggs is higher than in caged egg production. A study done in the University of Newcastle, UK, showed a 16% increase in greenhouse gas emissions from a free range facility compared to a battery cage facility.

== Health risks ==
In 2025, the Dutch National Institute for Public Health and the Environment deemed that home-grown free-range eggs in the Netherlands are no longer safe for human consumption due to pollution with PFAS. PFAS enter the eggs through bioaccumulation, first from the soil into worm tissues and finally from earthworms into chickens who consume them. In the majority of the locations sampled, people would exceed the safe PFAS limit after consuming a single egg per week, contributing to the exposure to PFAS which is already high due to other food sources and contaminated drinking water. A similar study conducted in Greece found that free-range eggs exceeded the safe limit for PFAS in the majority of the sampled locations.

== Rehoming charities ==
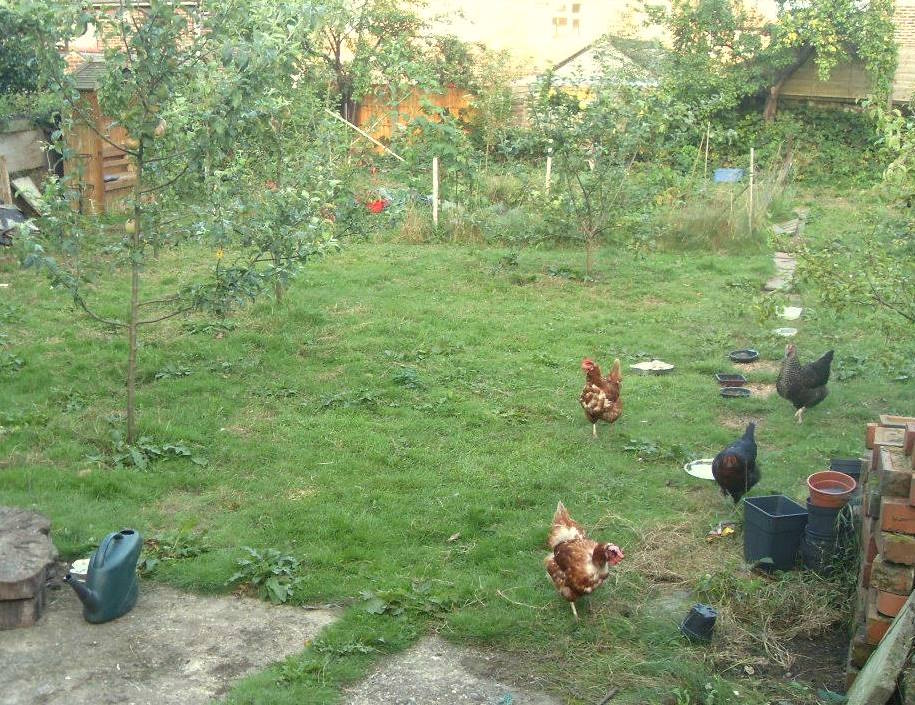
Rescue hens (red) and point-of-lay hens (dark) co-exist in a private orchard.

In the UK, charities such as Fresh Start for Hens and British Hen Welfare Trust organise rehoming for ex-factory hens that would otherwise be slaughtered. Private smallholders pay around £6 per "rescue hen", and these birds (which may still be laying daily) then spend a "retirement" in a true free-range environment. The BHW Trust says that there is no better education than watching an ex-battery hen's confusion and bewilderment turn into wonderment at her new environment.

== See also ==
- Organic egg production
- Free range
- Yarding
- Pastured poultry
- Factory farming
- Chickens as pets
- The Happy Egg Company
