= The Duckhorn Portfolio =

American wine company

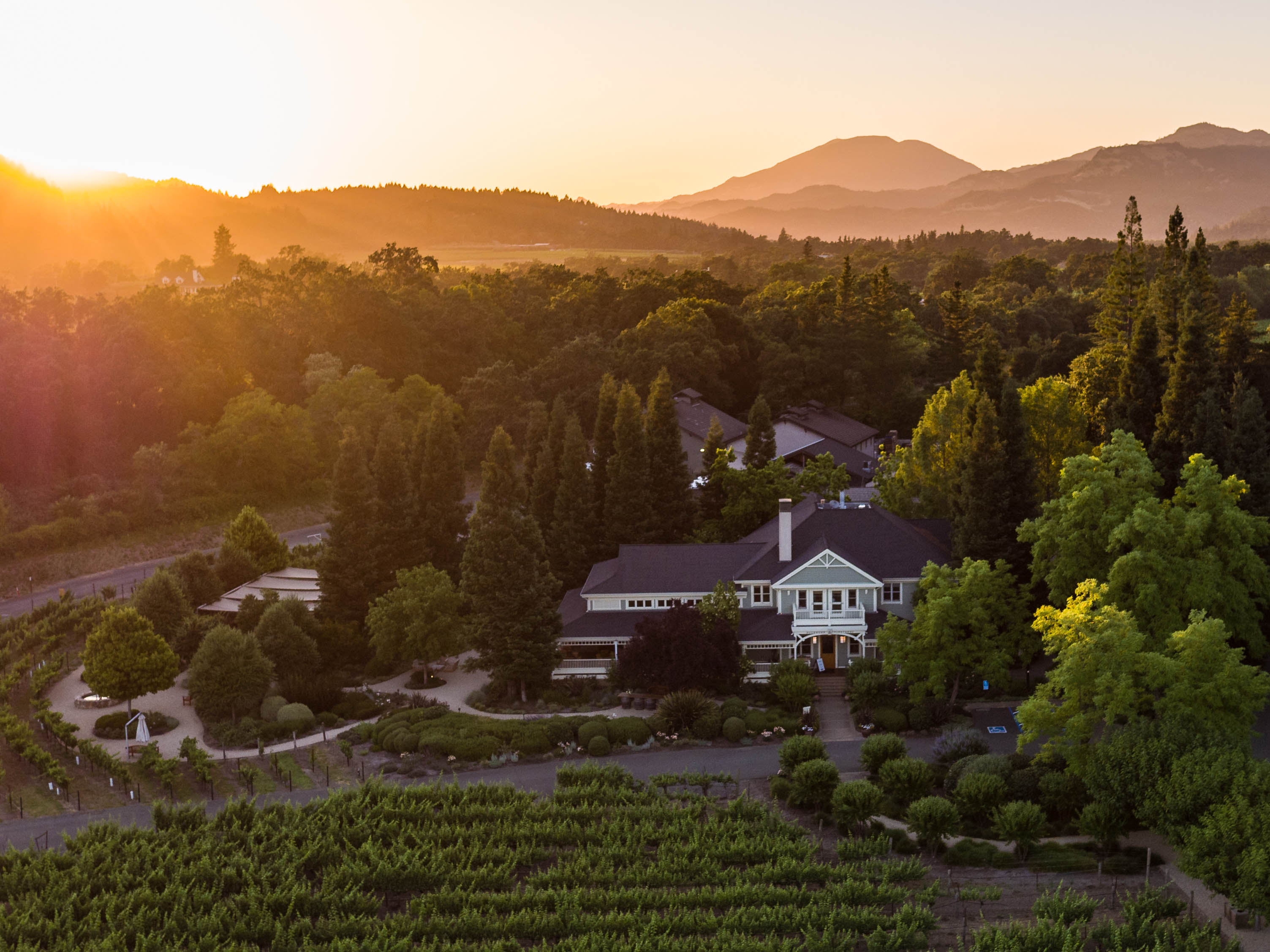
- Location: St. Helena, California, USA
- Coordinates: 38.529472°N 122.490705°W
- Appellation: Napa Valley AVA
- Founded: 1976; 50 years ago
- Parent company: Butterfly Equity (2024–present)
- Known for: Three Palms Vineyard Merlot, Calera, Kosta Browne
- Varietals: Merlot, Cabernet Sauvignon, Sauvignon Blanc, Chardonnay
- Website: duckhorn.com

The Duckhorn Portfolio Inc. is an American wine company producing varietal labelled and blended red, white, rosé, and sparkling wines from California and Washington State. The main winery, Duckhorn Vineyards, is outside St. Helena, California.

== History ==
The company was founded by Daniel and Margaret Duckhorn as The St. Helena Wine Company in 1976 with eight co-investors. His background was in business and finance – he had consulted for the wine and spirits company Heublein and had managed a Napa Valley vine grafting and root stock business that supplied vines to vineyard owners, which brought him into contact with Napa Valley winemakers. As the Duckhorns raised more capital, the number of investors grew to 80 in all.

In 1978, its first year, the company produced 800 cases each of Cabernet Sauvignon and Merlot wine, made from purchased grapes — the Merlot from Three Palms Vineyard near Calistoga, the Cabernet Sauvignon from Howell Mountain and the Stag's Leap District. The wines were released in 1980.

In July 2007 a controlling interest in the company was sold to GI Partners, a private equity firm which in 2016 sold its interest to TSG Consumer Partners, another private equity firm. The sale included six wineries: Duckhorn Vineyards, Goldeneye, Paraduxx, Migration, Decoy, and Canvasback, and vineyard property in Napa Valley, Sonoma County, Anderson Valley, and Washington State.

Margaret and Daniel Duckhorn remained active in the management of the company until 2016. Alex Ryan has been company president since 2005, CEO since 2011 and chairman of the board of directors since 2012.

In March 2021 the company was floated on the New York Stock Exchange. In December 2024 it was bought for approximately $1.95 billion by Butterfly Equity, a private equity firm.

== Vineyards ==
The company planted its first vineyards in 1981 in Napa Valley. Subsequent purchases of vineyards and wineries include:

- Anderson Valley vineyards—Mendocino County Pinot Noir, near Philo, CA. Initial purchase was 80 acres.
- Longwinds Estate—A 20-acre Washington State vineyard located in Yakima Valley’s Red Mountain AVA. The production, Cabernet Sauvignon, is sold as Canvasback.
- Three Palms Vineyard—Duckhorn had been purchasing Merlot grapes from this 73-acre vineyard since 1976 and was sole buyer of its grapes beginning in 2011.
- Calera—A Central Coast winery, founded in 1975 by Josh Jensen specializing in Pinot Noir. The sale included 85 acres of Pinot Noir vines in the Mount Harlan AVA.
- Kosta Browne—A Sonoma winery specializing in Pinot Noir. The deal included 80 acres of owned vineyards and leases on 90.

In 2021 the company owned ten wineries. It owned 750 acres of vineyards, producing wine under a variety of names, among them:

- Duckhorn Vineyards: Napa Valley red and white wine
- Decoy: varietal and blended red, white, rosé, and sparkling wines
- Paraduxx: Napa Valley blended red, white, and rosé
- Goldeneye: Anderson Valley Pinot Noir, Chardonnay, rosé, and sparkling
- Migration: red, white, rosé, and sparkling wines from Russian River Valley, Santa Maria Valley, and other locations.
- Canvasback: Cabernet Sauvignon, Syrah, Riesling, and rosé from Washington State

The Duckhorn Vineyards label is based on a nineteenth-century French lithograph. The original label was created by a shareholder and graphic artist, Bill Cain. The firm has taken legal action over the years against wine brands that use versions of the duck image or the word "duck". In 2014 it sued Trinchero Family Estates for its marketing of a wine called Duck Commander, and Walmart, which retailed it. A settlement was reached allowing a limited amount of Duck Commander to be sold.

== Recognition ==
- San Francisco Chronicle "Winemaker of the Year", 2005
- Wine Spectator "Wine of the Year", 2017
