= Jidori =

Jidori is a Japanese homophone which may refer to:

- Jidori, (地鶏), literally "local chicken", chickens whose parents or one parent are native to Japan and raised according to a prescribed method, such as cage free or free range
- Jidori, (自撮り), literally "something taken of oneself", a selfie
