= William Stillman =

William Stillman may refer to:

- William James Stillman (1828–1901), American journalist, diplomat, author, historian, and photographer
- William O. Stillman (1856–1924), American physician, animal welfare activist, humanitarian and medical writer
