= AECL (disambiguation) =

AECL may refer to:

- Advanced Electronics Company Limited
- Atomic Energy of Canada Limited
- Australian Eggs
