= Terra de Promissio =

Coordinates: 38°14′02″N 122°34′22″W

- Location: Petaluma, Sonoma County, California, USA
- Appellation: Sonoma Coast AVA
- Founded: 1999
- First vines planted: 2002
- First vintage: 2005
- Key people: Charles Karren, owner Diana Karren, owner
- Area cultivated: 50
- Varietal: Pinot Noir
- Website: www.terradepromissio.com

Terra de Promissio (English: The Land of Promise) is a family owned and operated vineyard that grows Sonoma Coast pinot noir grapes. The vineyard is located in the Sonoma Coast AVA, outside Petaluma, California in Sonoma County.

== History ==
Terra de Promissio was founded, developed, and operated by husband-and-wife Charles Karren and Diana Karren. Charles and Diana oversaw the planting of 33,000 vines in 2002. Terra de Promissio had its first harvest in 2005 and sold to 3 wineries. In 2012 and 2013, they planted an additional 18,000 vines to bring the total planted acreage of Terra de Promissio to 50 acres. In 2015, the vineyard had its 11th harvest and sold fruit to 13 wineries.

== Vineyard ==
Terra de Promissio encompasses 50 acres of pinot noir vines. The first 32 acres were planted in 2002 to Dijon Clones 115 and 777. In 2012 and 2013, the remaining 18 acres were planted to Clones 943, 97 and Field Blend - which the winemakers sometime call Calera.

== Wineries ==
The following wineries use Terra de Promissio fruit to make their wine: Castello di Amorosa, Domaine Della, Dutcher Crossing, Hanzell, Kistler, Kosta Browne, Land of Promise, Lynmar Estate, Notre Vin, Senses, Soliste, Spell Estate, Whetstone, and Williams Selyem.

Seven wineries give Terra de Promissio a vineyard designation: Castello di Amorosa, Domaine Della, Land of Promise, Notre Vin, Spell Estate, Whetstone and Williams Selyem.

== Awards ==
In 2011, Wine Spectator named the 2009 Kosta Browne Sonoma Coast Pinot Noir as its 2011 Wine of the Year. The wine comprises fruit from three vineyards including Terra de Promissio. It is the first Sonoma County wine to win the award since 1999 and the first ever Pinot Noir wine to win. Wine Spectator editors tasted and reviewed over 16,000 new releases from 12 countries, and they noted the Kosta Browne Sonoma Coast bottling showcases Michael Browne's meticulous winemaking and the quality of their grape sources. The 2009 Kosta Browne Sonoma Coast Pinot Noir rated 95 points on Wine Spectator's 100-point scale.

Since the inaugural vintage in 2005, Terra de Promissio wines have received over 20 scores of 90 or more, including a 96 for the 2011 Williams Selyem Terra de Promissio and 94 for the 2009 Lynmar Terra de Promissio, the highest score Lynmar has ever received from Wine Spectator.

== Land of Promise ==
In late 2015, Charles Karren, Diana Karren, and Diana's sister Alina Zarr launched Land of Promise Wine. The wine is a Sonoma Coast Pinot Noir made exclusively with grapes from Terra de Promissio. For the 2013 vintage, 100 cases were made.
