= Tom Rinaldi (winemaker) =

American businessman

- Born: August 8, 1949; San Francisco, California, U.S.
- Died: September 6, 2026 (aged 77); St. Helena, California
- Education: University of California, Davis
- Occupation: Winemaker
- Years active: 1978-2026
- Known for: Popularizing Merlot wines

Tom Rinaldi was an American winemaker best known for developing the Merlot varietal for Duckhorn Vineyards. In his later years, Rinaldi owned and operated his own winery and worked as an international winemaking consultant.

== Early life and education ==
Tom Rinaldi was born in San Francisco, California to John and Josephine Rinaldi who operated a successful Tupperware business. Along with his younger brother Charles, Tom Rinaldi enjoyed the San Francisco music scene that featured bands such as the Grateful Dead and Jefferson Airplane but decided to avoid prevalent hard drug scene by joining the Navy at the age of 17. Assigned to a typhoon tracker unit in Guam he also spent time in Vietnam during war. After his honorable discharge from the Navy, Rinaldi used the GI Bill to attend Santa Rosa Junior College and then the University of California, Davis. Rinaldi initially intended to become a veterinarian, but switched to studying winemaking after noticing that students studying winemaking were happier than pre-med students. In 1976, Rinaldi graduated from UC Davis with a viticultural degree.

== Career ==
After graduation, Rinaldi's first job was an internship at Freemark Abbey Winery in Napa Valley, an opportunity he later described a position he later called "a great job, and a great honor.". He later worked at Round Hill winery. In 1978, Daniel and Margaret Duckhorn, the co-founders of Duckhorn Vineyards in Napa Valley were looking for an experienced winemaker when a young Tom Rinaldi arrived on his Harley-Davidson, with "a pack of cigarettes rolled up in the sleeve of his t-shirt." The Duckhorns hired him, purchased Merlot grapes from Three Palms Vineyard, a neighboring vineyard in Calistoga and in 1978 released 800 cases of Duckhorn Vineyards 1978 Three Palms Vineyard Merlot. At the time, Merlot was not a popular wine in the United States, but their version of the varietal was well received by critics and other wineries soon followed suit resulting in Merlot becoming one of the country's most popular wines even though it's reputation would eventually be diminished as the varietal's quantity took precedence over quality.

As Napa Valley's reputation as a premium wine making area grew, Rinaldi, in his signature cargo shorts and Hawaiian shirts, became well known for training and mentoring other winemakers in the region. He went on to create 22 vintages before leaving Duckhorn in 2000. After his departure, he worked at Hewitt and Provenance wineries, both in California, where his skill at selecting and blending wines were in high demand. He later provided advice and assistance to both domestic and foreign wineries. In 2014, Rinaldi stepped away from daily wine production, although he continued a supervisory role at Patent Wines, which he co-owned. In a 2023 interview while creating his 48th vintage, Rinaldi said his work making wine never got old: "Almost half a century of doing this and each vintage has been completely different. It's fun; that's a big reason why I keep doing it. But it's also a lot more than that, too."

During his later years, Rinaldi decided to return to Vietnam and visit Da Nang, Chu Lai, Phu Bai and Hue, explaining to an interviewer, "I had to visit each and every one of those and you know, just kind of wash up the memories."

== Death and legacy ==
Rinaldi died on September 6, 2026. He was preceded in death by his wife, Beverly. His survivors included his daughter, Bigelow, and six grandchildren. At the time of his death, Patent Wines said that his final vintages would be released in 2027 and 2028.

Largely due to his success at Duckhorn, Rinaldi is often credited with single-handedly popularizing Merlot wines, a varietal that became so widespread during the 90s and early 2000s it was satirized in the 2004 movie Sideways.

“He put Merlot on the map in the modern era. That’s what I think most people know him for. But the other thing was that he was so generous with his time and advice for all of us. He’d be incredibly forthcoming.” -- Doug Shafer, Shafer Vineyards

“So much of what defines Duckhorn Vineyards today can be traced back to Tom. He developed the first wines and, in doing so, helped establish a style and a sense of place that has endured for 50 years. Tom valued elegance and approachability over sheer power. His focus was always site expression, balance and wines that were enjoyable but built to age.” -- Renée Ary, Duckhorn’s executive winemaker.

“I cannot think of a winemaker who was more universally liked than Tom. His signature outfit of cargo shorts and Hawaiian shirt gleefully wiped away any sense of Napa pretension. He was a mentor to countless younger winemakers and thereby shaped the wine styles of Napa Valley." -- James McCeney, senior director of winemaking at Patz & Hall
