= Nora Trueblood Gause =

American humanitarian

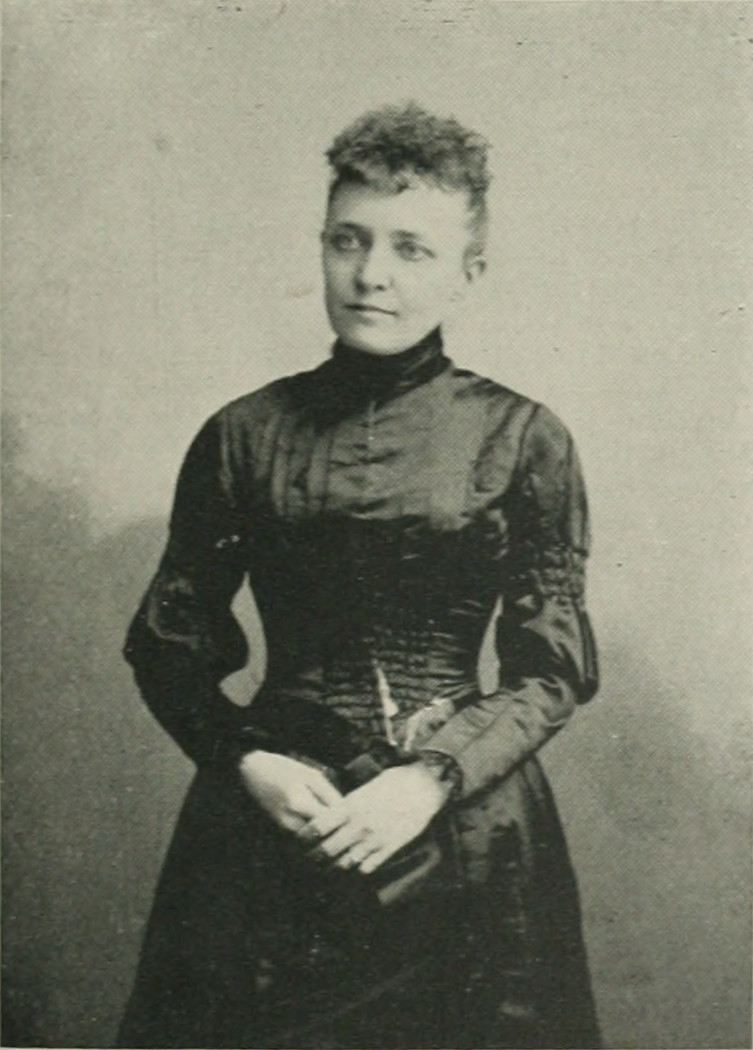
- "A Woman of the Century"
- Born: Elnora E. Trueblood; February 9, 1851; Russiaville, Indiana, U.S.
- Died: June 13, 1955 (aged 104); Kokomo, Indiana, U.S.
- Occupations: humanitarian; teacher; non-fiction writer
- Awards: Humanitarian of the Year (1952)

Nora Trueblood Gause (née, Trueblood; February 9, 1851 – June 13, 1955) was an American humanitarian. She spent twenty years as a school teacher in Howard County, Indiana, where she lived her entire life. Nora was active for many years in the Humane Society of the United States and the National Audubon Society, also she was a writer for the Humane Journal. In 1952, she was the recipient of the American Humane Association's "American Humane Award" (Humanitarian of the Year).

== Biography ==
Elnora (nickname, "Nora") E. Trueblood was born on a farm 2.5 miles (4.0 km) southeast of Russiaville, Indiana and 55 miles (89 km) north of Indianapolis, Indiana, February 9, 1851. She was a daughter of Thomas Elwood and Sarah Jane Trueblood. Her siblings were Lindley (1853–1890) and Flora (1858–1943). Her parents being members of the Society of Friends, well educated and of a progressive spirit, the daughter naturally championed the cause of the downtrodden.

== Career ==
Early in life, she manifested a love for declamation and composition, and her first writings were remarkable for their emphatic denunciation of wrong and earnest pleadings for right.

From 1868 to 1888, she served in the public schools of Indiana as a teacher. The succeeding five years, were given to home and family, but, so successful was she in reaching the public, that she was often called to the platform as a lecturer and organizer.

In October, 1886, she joined the humane workers of Chicago and spent the four succeeding months in writing for the Humane Journal. In March, 1887, she began to organize societies for the prevention of cruelty, holding public meetings and doing whatever she could to awaken thought on the humane question. She published occasional letters descriptive of her travels and work accomplished, and other articles in the Humane Journal. In 1914, The National Humane Review noted that Gause, in continuing her work as Superintendent of the Department of Mercy, of Howard County, distributed 15,000 pages of humane literature that year. In 1919, when she returned home from the Norfolk meeting of the American Humane Association, she gave a three column article to the Kokomo Daily Dispatch, regarding the result of her trip. The publicity which came in this way enabled the message of the convention to reach thousands of people who were not able to attend the sessions.

== Personal life ==
On January 14, 1880, she married William Gause (1842–1885).

In politics, she was a Republican.

A long-time resident of Kokomo, Indiana, she died at that city's Good Samaritan Hospital, June 13, 1955, and was buried at Crown Point Cemetery.

== Awards and honors ==
- 1952, American Humane Award
