= Qdoba =

American restaurant chain

Qdoba Restaurant Corporation

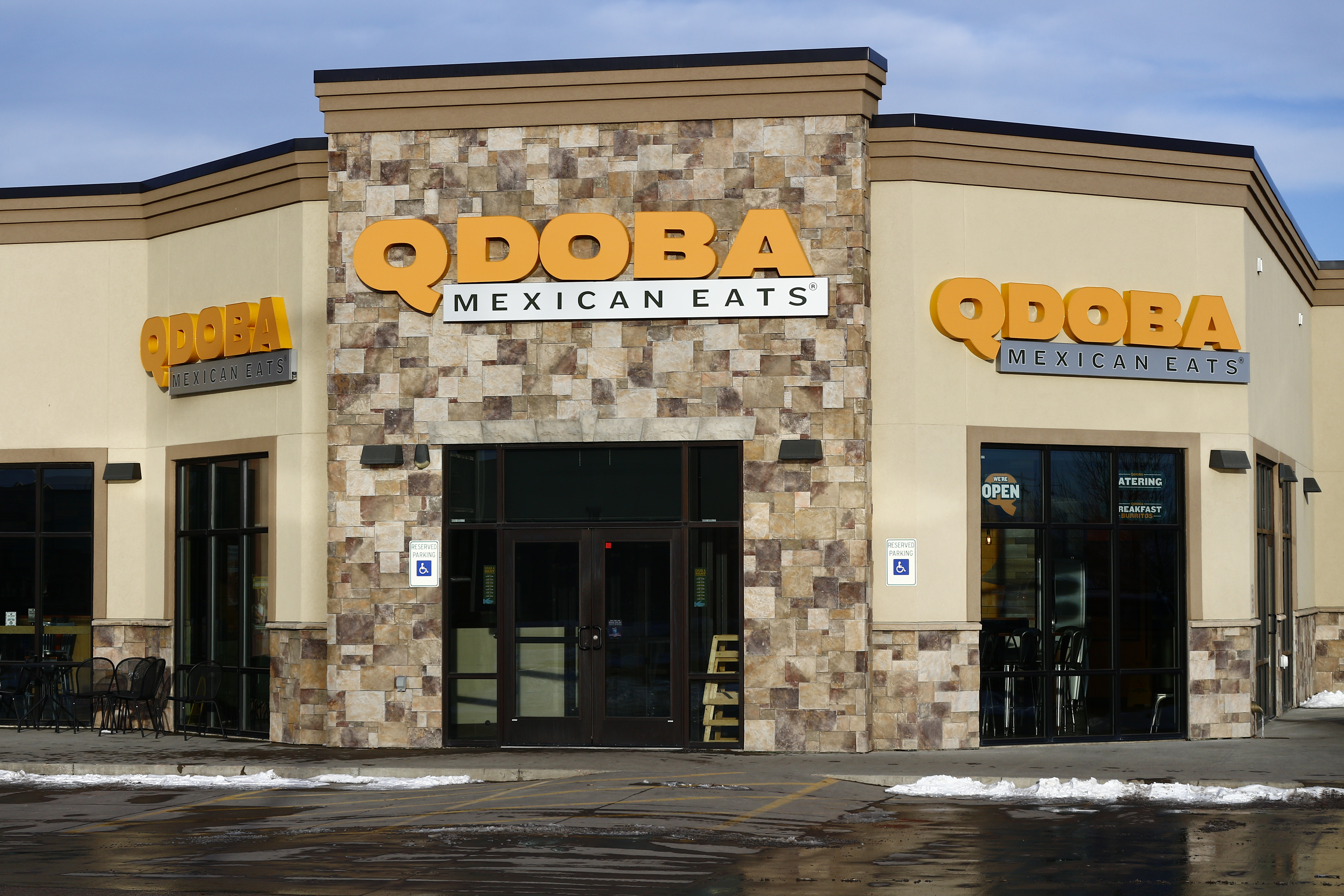
- A Qdoba Mexican Eats in Gillette, Wyoming
- Trade name: Qdoba Mexican Eats
- Formerly: Zuma Fresh Mexican Grill (1995–1997); Z-Teca Mexican Grill (1997–1999); Qdoba Mexican Grill (1999–2015)
- Type: Private
- Industry: Restaurants
- Genre: Fast Casual
- Founded: 1995; 31 years ago as Zuma Fresh Mexican Grill in Denver, Colorado, U.S.
- Founders: Anthony Miller; Robert Hauser
- Headquarters: 350 Camino De La Reina #400, San Diego, California, United States
- Number of locations: 890+ (as of November 2026)
- Area served: United States; Canada
- Key people: John Cywinski (CEO)
- Products: Burritos, tacos, quesadillas, nachos, taco salads
- Owner: Butterfly Equity
- Number of employees: Over 16,000 (2023)
- Website: qdoba.com

Qdoba Restaurant Corporation, doing business as Qdoba Mexican Eats or simply Qdoba (/kjuːˈdoʊbə/ kew-DOH-bə), is a chain of fast casual restaurants in the United States and Canada serving Mexican-style cuisine. After 15 years as a wholly owned subsidiary of Jack in the Box, the company was sold to a consortium of funds led by Apollo Global Management in March 2018. In October 2022, Qdoba was acquired by Butterfly Equity. At the time of the acquisition, Qdoba had nearly 750 locations across North America. It is the No. 2 player and No. 1 franchisor of Mexican fast-casual dining in North America. The chain was founded in 1995 as Zuma Fresh Mexican Grill in Denver, Colorado, by Anthony Miller and Robert Hauser.

== History ==
This chain traces its origins to the opening of the Zuma Fresh Mexican Grill in 1995 by Colorado native Anthony Miller and partner Robert Hauser at Grant Street and Sixth Avenue in Denver, which is still in operation.

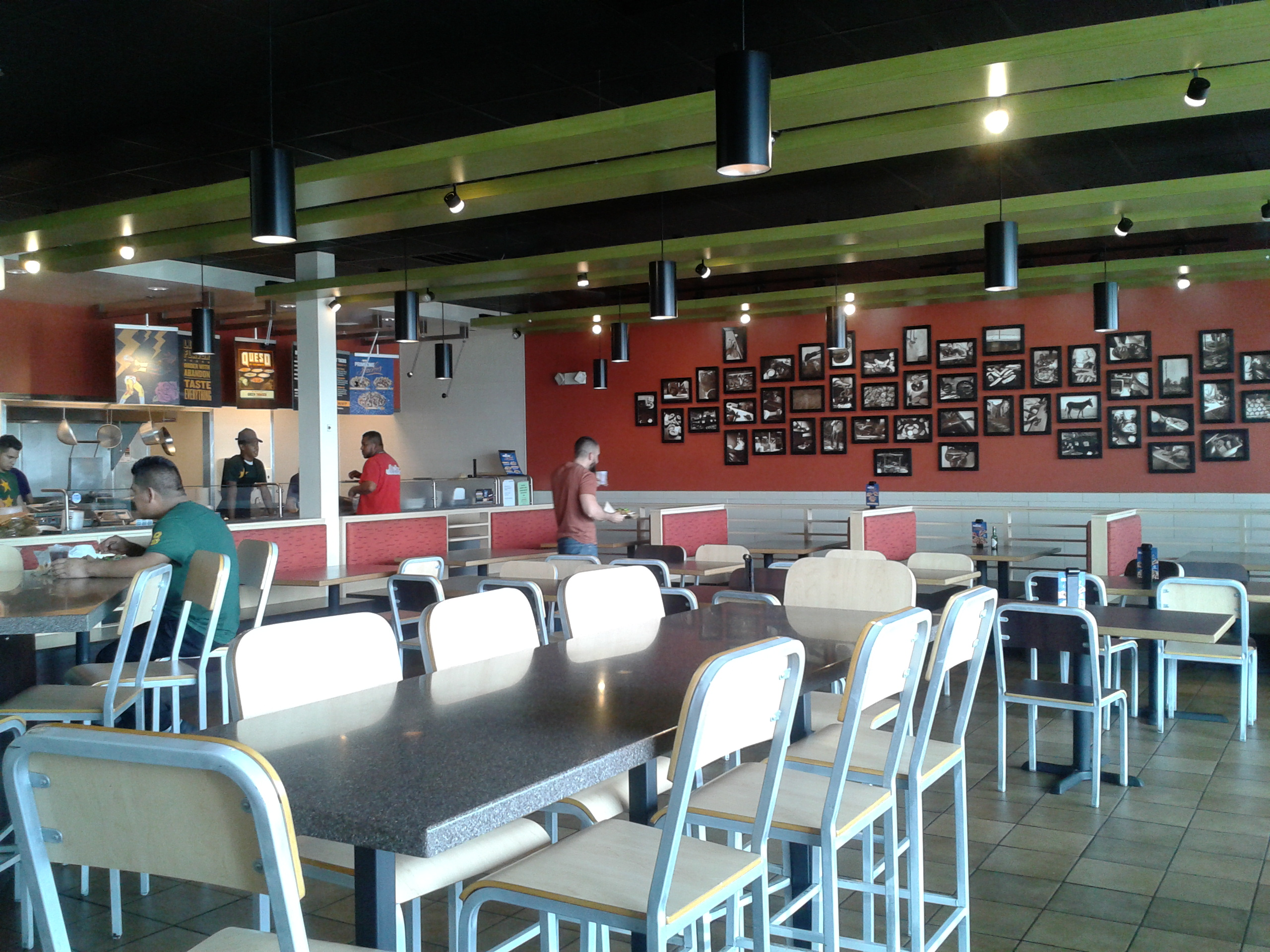
Interior of a Qdoba restaurant, Woodbridge, Virginia

Miller and Hauser met in New York City, where Miller was an investment banker with Merrill Lynch, and Hauser attended the Culinary Institute of America, working at the famed Le Cirque restaurant. Hauser developed most of the recipes, designing the menu to be healthier by replacing traditional animal fats with vegetable oils and using more fresh vegetables and herbs. During the first year, lines stretched out the door most evenings, but it usually took roughly seven minutes for customers in a 30-person line to be served. Zuma was a made-up name but was also the name of a friend's cat.

The Denver location was an immediate success, with first-year revenues exceeding $1,500,000. The cost of opening the 1,300-square-foot (120 m^{2}) store had been only $180,000.

In 1997, the name of the company was changed from Zuma to Z-Teca Mexican Grill because of a lawsuit from another restaurant using Zuma in Boston and confusion caused by the similar-sounding name of a chain that was operating in the Denver area at that time, ZuZu Handmade Mexican Grill. During the same year, Z-teca began to offer franchise opportunities to entrepreneurs to expand the chain outside of its core territory of Colorado.

In exchange for a large stake, Western Capital and other investors gave the company a large infusion of capital in early 1998 to allow the company to open 25 new locations and nearly triple its size. Later that year, Gary Beisler was hired to replace Miller as president and chief operating officer, while Miller remained chief executive officer. By mid-1998, Z-Teca had 21 locations in 9 states, with 10 of those locations being franchises. At that time, a chicken burrito cost only $4.79. By December 1999, Z-Teca had 49 locations in 19 states.

Even though Z-Teca was another made-up name, there were lawsuits by Z'Tejas Southwestern Grill in Arizona and Azteca in Washington state claiming that Z-Teca was too similar to their names and infringed upon their trade names. To overcome these problems, Qdoba was invented in 1999 by ad agency Heckler Associates. At the time of the name change to Qdoba Mexican Grill, Gary Beisler replaced Miller as CEO.

Jack in the Box paid $45 million in cash to obtain the Wheat Ridge–based Qdoba from ACI Capital, Western Growth Capital, and other private investors in early 2003.

Qdoba repurchased 25 stores located in Kentucky, Indiana, and Tennessee from ZT of Louisville, Inc., one its largest franchisees, for an undisclosed sum in mid-2012. Tim Casey replaced Gary Beisler as CEO in March 2013.

In October 2012, Beisler announced his retirement and was replaced the following March by Tim Casey. Three years later, Casey was replaced as brand president by Keith Guilbault in May 2016.

In June 2013, Qdoba announced it would close a total of 67 underperforming restaurants, including 18 in and around Chicago. By late 2013, Qdoba operated over 600 fast-casual restaurant locations throughout the United States.

In October 2014, Qdoba changed its price structure to "all-inclusive", in which the price only depended on the type of protein ($7.80 for chicken or vegetarian items and $8.40 for steak, shredded beef or pork), but included all of the "extras" that previously incurred an additional charge, such as guacamole and queso sauce. Thereafter, most people who routinely ordered the "extras" with their burritos did not see much of a price difference. However, light eaters complained that if they wanted to maintain their light eating habits by ordering a simple item, they were hit with as much as a $2-per-item price increase (as an example, the Craft 2 which went up to $8.40 from $6.49) by paying for items they did not want (like the guacamole), subsidizing other customers who previously paid for the "extras".

In 2014, Qdoba moved its headquarters from its longtime home in Wheat Ridge to nearby Lakewood. A little over two years later, San Diego–based corporate parent Jack in the Box decided to integrate Qdoba's headquarters into Jack in the Box's main headquarters in California starting in January 2017.

Faced with sluggish growth, management decided to make a change in their marketing strategy. As part of the new strategy, the trade name of the restaurants was changed to Qdoba Mexican Eats in October 2015 in the hope of trying to distinguish itself from similar-sounding competitors.

By July 2016, the company had 650 restaurants in 47 states, the District of Columbia, and Canada.

In December 2017, a consortium of funds led by Apollo Global Management announced the purchase of the Qdoba chain for approximately $305 million. At the time of the announcement, Qdoba had approximately 700 restaurants in 47 states. The sale was completed in March 2018. Jack in the Box Inc. received $305 million in cash for more than 700 locations in 47 states, the District of Columbia and Canada. After Apollo had complete its acquisition, Keith Guilbault was promoted from brand president to chief executive officer in May 2018.

In June 2019, Qdoba finally moved its headquarters from the building that it had previously shared for the past two years with its former corporate parent Jack in the Box in Kearny Mesa to the Amp&rsand building in Mission Valley.

In 2021, Qdoba promoted tenured operating officer Eric Williams to chief operating officer, a position he still holds.

In October 2022, Qdoba was officially acquired by Butterfly Equity via a merger transaction with Modern Restaurant Concepts ("MRC"), an industry-leading "better-for-you" fast casual restaurant platform consisting of two brands: Modern Market Eatery and Lemonade. At the time of the acquisition, Qdoba had nearly 750 locations across North America.

In January 2023, it was announced that effective immediately, former Applebee's president John Cywinski would be CEO of Modern Restaurant Concepts, Qdoba's parent company.

As of November 2026, Qdoba operates over 870 fast-casual restaurant locations throughout the United States, in addition to 14 locations in Canada, four in Puerto Rico, and one at Camp Foster on Okinawa Island in Japan.

== Butterfly Equity Ownership ==
Qdoba is owned by Modern Restaurant Concepts, a fast-casual restaurant platform that is a portfolio company of Butterfly Equity. Butterfly Equity is a Los Angeles, California-based private equity firm specializing in the food sector. Under Butterfly's ownership, Qdoba opened 40 restaurants in 2023 as of August, and plans to open 60 restaurants in 2024 and over 80 annually beginning in 2025. Through a selective refranchising strategy, the company sold a portion of company-owned restaurants to franchisees to achieve a franchised mix of ~80% as of August 2023.

== International ==
The first Canadian location opened on December 3, 2012, in Brandon, Manitoba. A second location was opened in London, Ontario, three months later. A third location opened in Winnipeg in 2014. As of October 2023, there are 12 locations in Canada and no locations exist in any other country.

Puerto Rico had its first location opened on June 6, 2022, in San Patricio Village in Guaynabo, Puerto Rico. As of 2026, there are only 4 locations in Puerto Rico, but are planning to expand 12 extra outlets in the coming years.

== Fare ==
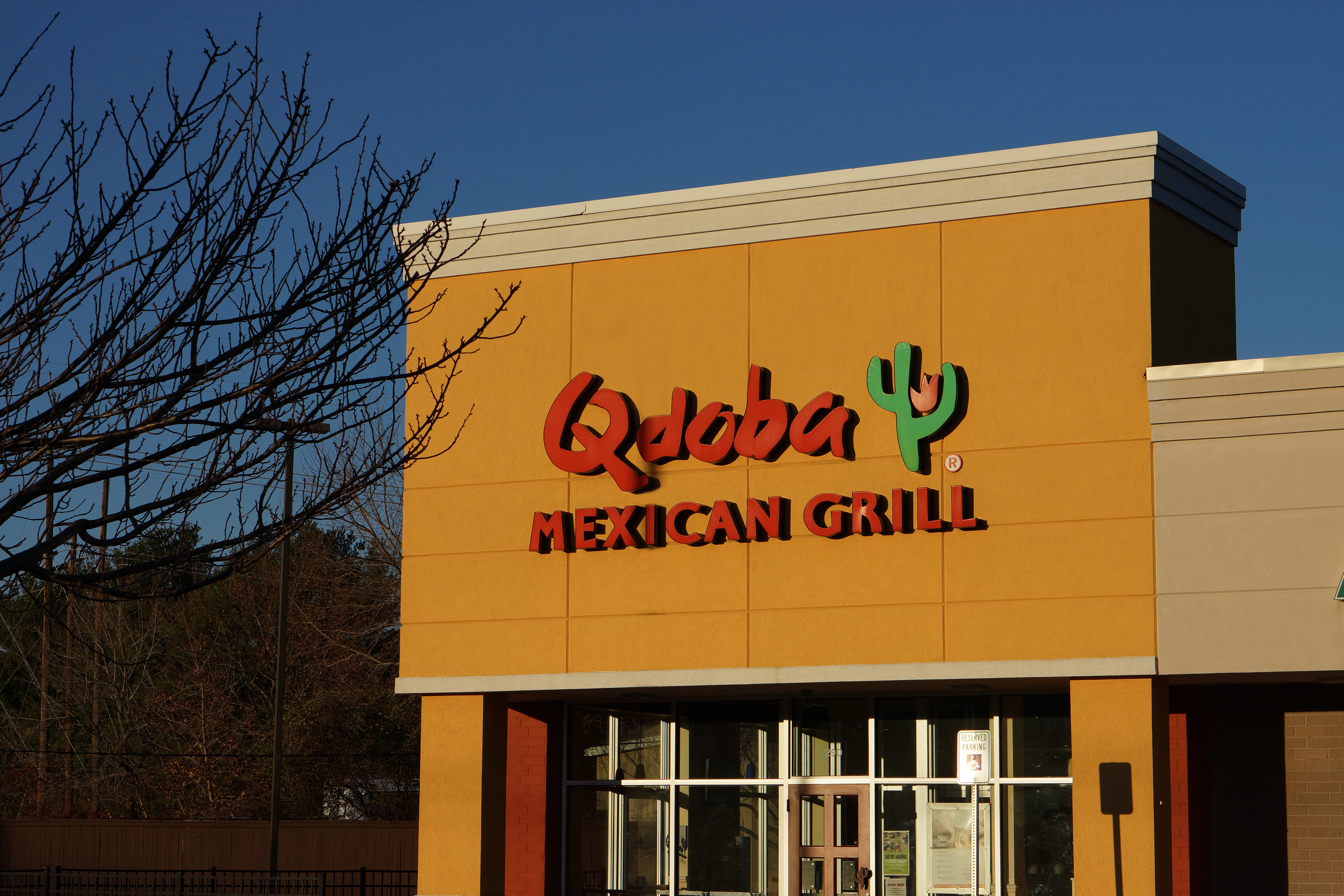
Qdoba Mexican Grill on Andover St. in Peabody, Massachusetts

Qdoba serves burritos made in the San Francisco burrito style, and other foods such as tacos, quesadillas, chile con queso and tortilla soup. The restaurant fits into the "fast casual" category, offering both quick service and a higher quality of food than typical fast-food restaurants. Customers order by selecting an entrée then choosing its ingredients. All of the items are made in plain view of the customer.

To distinguish itself from some of its competitors, Qdoba serves breakfast, and some locations are open 24 hours on weekends.

Qdoba has also opened restaurants in non-traditional locations, such as directly on college campuses, and participates in some college meal plans.

Through agreements with the Army & Air Force Exchange Service, Qdoba can be found on select U.S. military bases across the nation.

== Competition ==
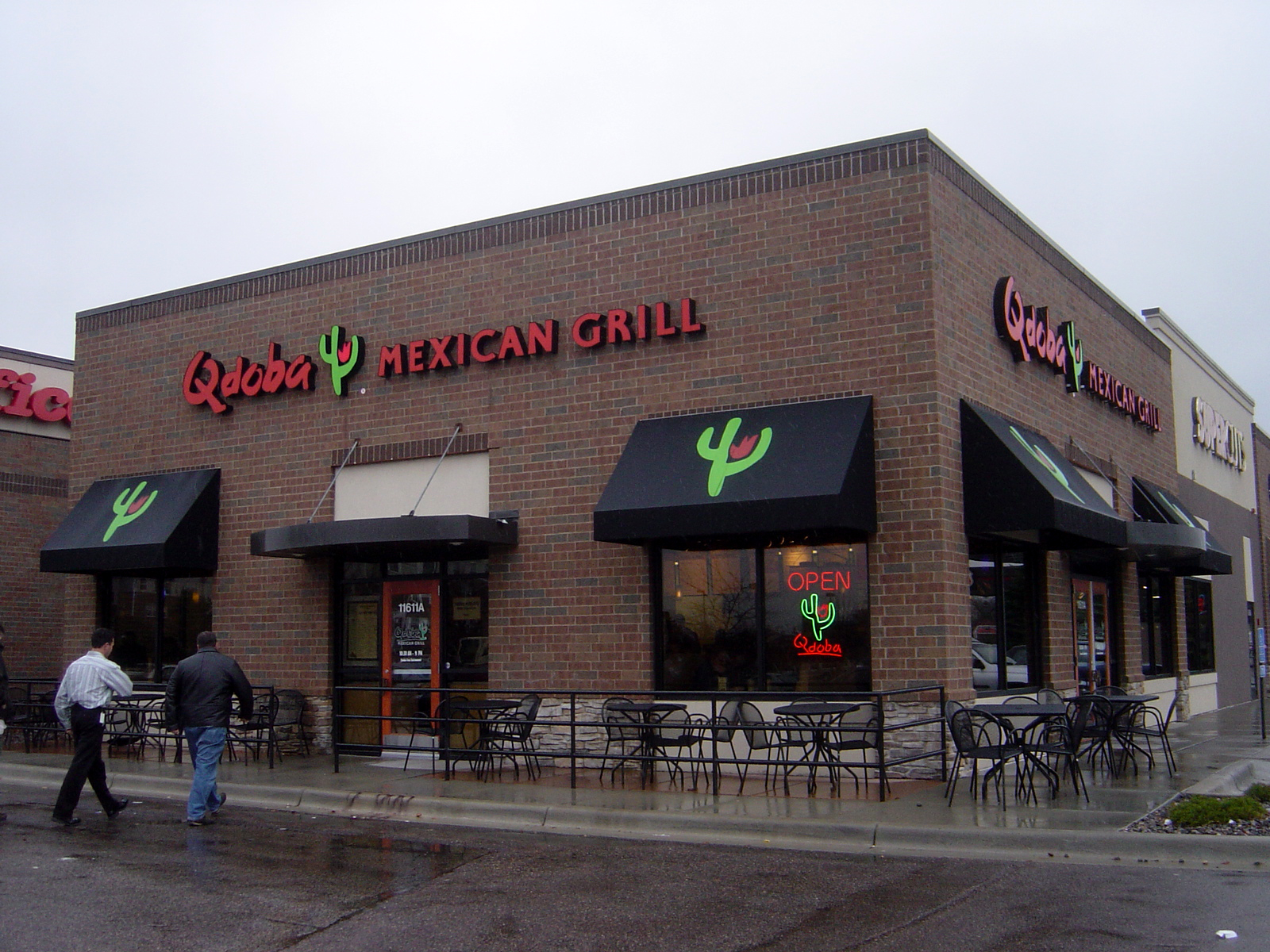
A Qdoba Mexican Grill in Eden Prairie, Minnesota

The main national rivals to Qdoba are Chipotle Mexican Grill (which also started in Denver, two years before Qdoba), Baja Fresh, Moe's Southwest Grill and, to a lesser extent, Panchero's Mexican Grill, Salsarita's Fresh Mexican Grill, and Rubio's Coastal Grill.

== Incidents and lawsuits ==
=== White City Shopping Center ===
In 2006, the company was involved in a lawsuit in which Panera Bread attempted to invoke a clause in Panera's contract with the White City Shopping Center in Shrewsbury, Massachusetts, to stop the opening of a Qdoba Mexican Grill. The clause provided that Panera would be the only sandwich shop in the shopping center. Panera argued that burritos and other tortilla-based foods were, in fact, sandwiches. Superior Court Judge Jeffrey Locke ruled against Panera, concluding, "A sandwich is not commonly understood to include burritos, tacos and quesadillas, which are typically made with a single tortilla and stuffed with a choice filling of meat, rice, and beans."

=== 2015 typhoid incident ===
Three customers who got sick after eating at a Qdoba restaurant in Firestone, Colorado, were found to have been infected with the bacterium Salmonella typhi which causes typhoid fever. Two of the customers had to be hospitalized. The source of the infection was traced to an infected food handler who was asymptomatic.

=== Violation of child labor laws ===
In 2019, a minor filed a complaint to the General Attorney's Office at Newton, Massachusetts, stating that they had worked overtime at Qdoba. This led to a state-wide investigation that resulted in auditing all locations in Massachusetts. Qdoba paid over $400,000 in citations due to the thousands of violations they received due to Massachusetts' child labor laws.

=== Glenwood Springs food contamination ===
In 2020, four customers were hospitalized after consuming contaminated food in Glenwood Springs, Colorado. The food was contaminated by an unspecified chemical. Only two out of the four customers experienced symptoms. The incident caused Qdoba to close down temporarily. After the release of the individuals, Qdoba reopened. No action was taken by the individuals.

=== Gestation crates ===
In 2012, Qdoba committed to ending the use of gestation crates for their pork supply by 2022. In 2024, animal welfare groups criticized Qdoba for not reporting progress on this goal.

== See also ==
- List of Mexican restaurants
