= Robin Ganzert =

President and CEO of American Humane

Robin Ganzert is the president and CEO of American Humane, the country's oldest national humane organization. American Humane works to protect animals and children from abuse and harm. Ganzert is the author of the book Animal Stars: Behind the Scenes with Your Favorite Animal Actors (2014). In February 2017, Ganzert was elected to the Forbes Nonprofit Council for Chief Executive Officers.

== Education and career ==
Ganzert received her B.S. and M.B.A. from Wake Forest University, and her Ph.D. from the University of North Carolina at Greensboro.

Before working at American Humane, Ganzert served as deputy director of philanthropic services at the Pew Charitable Trusts, and she also was a national director of philanthropic strategies with Wachovia.

As CEO of American Humane, Ganzert works to increase global awareness about the organization, improve its efficiency, and boost the effectiveness of its programs. She also conducts numerous interviews and makes frequent public appearances on behalf of the organization. When Ganzert took over as CEO in 2010, American Humane had operated at a substantial deficit each of the previous four years. By consolidating American Humane's 40 programs into five platforms — American Humane Conservation, American Humane Farm Program, American Humane Hollywood, American Humane Rescue, and the Lois Pope LIFE Center for Military Affairs — the organization now operates with annual surpluses. During her tenure as CEO, American Humane has quadrupled the number of children and animals under its protection.

In 2015, Ganzert successfully spearheaded the effort to change U.S. law, ensuring the return of retired military working dogs to American soil after their service overseas and reunion with their handlers. The following year, she launched the world's first certification program dedicated solely to the welfare of animals in zoos and aquariums.

Robin Ganzert is the author of the book Animal Stars: Behind the Scenes with Your Favorite Animal Actors (2014), which discusses the animals and trainers featured in popular movies and TV shows.

== Awards ==
Ganzert is a recipient of the Brava Award for top female CEOs in Washington, D.C. She was also named the Rare Life Leadership Award winner for her work in the humane field.

== Position on animal welfare ==
Ganzert is a proponent of the Five Freedoms test to determine the state of an animal's welfare. The Five Freedoms stipulate that animals should be free from pain, free from fear, free from discomfort, free from hunger, and free to express natural behaviors.

She has stated that American Humane's intent is "to have food supply animals treated as humanely as possible, at the same time our goal is to work with agriculture, educate them as to the best standards of humane animal welfare — and not put them out of business."

Ganzert advocates for the federal reimbursement of military veterans who use service dogs to treat symptoms of PTSD.
