= MaryRuth Ghiyam =

American businesswoman

MaryRuth Ghiyam is an American health educator, writer, and founder of MaryRuth Organics.

== Early life ==
Ghiyam was born in Somerville, New Jersey to parents Colleen and Richard Boehmer. Her family partially owned Warren Lumber and Millwork, Inc., a lumber and millwork business.

== Career ==
In 2010, Ghiyam and her mother ventured into real estate to overcome their financial challenges.

She founded MaryRuth's Organics, a wellness brand offering vegan and non-GMO vitamins and supplements, in 2014 with her mother. Her first product was a raspberry-flavored liquid morning multivitamin, followed by a coconut-flavored liquid nighttime multimineral.

Butterfly, a Los Angeles-based private equity firm specializing in the food sector, invested in MaryRuth Organics in 2021.

In 2022, Gary Vaynerchuk joined the company as a member of its board of directors.

== Media ==
Ghiyam has appeared as a guest on various shows, including The Drew Barrymore Show, and Access Daily.

Her book, "Liquids till Lunch: 12 Small Habits That Will Change Your Life for Good," published by HarperCollins, debuted on the Wall Street Journal and LA Times bestsellers list in June 2021.

== Personal life ==
In 2013, Ghiyam married David Ghiyam, and they have four children.

In 2021, she bought a Beverly Hills mansion from Gyorgy Gattyan for $26.3 Million.
