= Pancheros Mexican Grill =

Restaurant chain in the United States

Panchero's Franchise Corporation

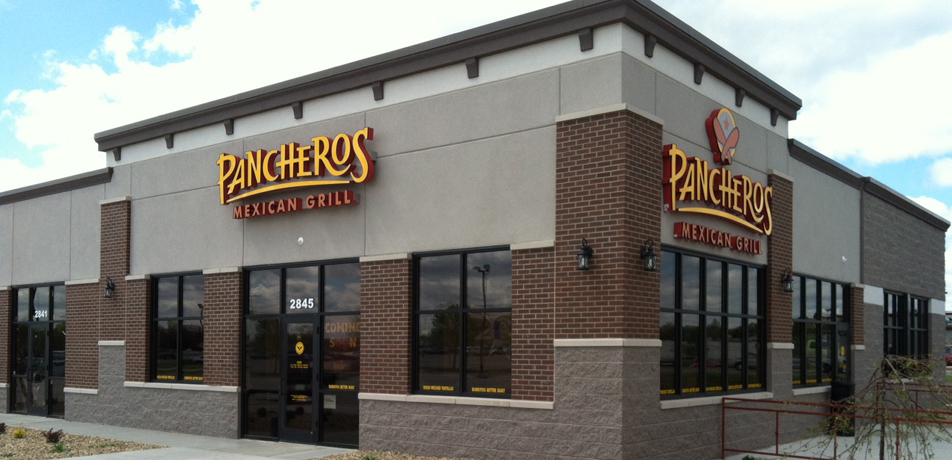
- Pancheros in Waterloo, Iowa
- Trade name: Pancheros Mexican Grill
- Type: Private
- Industry: Restaurants
- Founded: August 14, 1992; 34 years ago in Iowa City, Iowa, U.S.
- Founder: Rodney Anderson
- Headquarters: Coralville, Iowa, U.S.
- Number of locations: 74+
- Area served: United States
- Key people: Rodney Anderson (President)
- Website: pancheros.com

Panchero's Franchise Corporation, doing business as Pancheros Mexican Grill, is a chain of fast casual Tex-Mex restaurants in the United States serving Mexican-style cuisine. The chain was founded on August 14, 1992, by Rodney Anderson, who opened two units simultaneously: one in Iowa City, Iowa (near the University of Iowa campus), and one in East Lansing, Michigan (near the Michigan State University campus). As of 2024, the chain has over 70 locations in 13 states, with a strong presence in the Midwest and expanding into the Northeast.

Pancheros is known for pressing fresh tortillas on-site at the time of ordering using a device called the "Fresher Presser 7000." The chain also distinguishes itself through its practice of mixing burrito ingredients together before rolling, using a plastic spatula marketed as "Bob the Tool".

== History ==
=== Founding and early years ===
Anderson, a native of Illinois, was inspired to open Pancheros after frequenting Chicago taquerias during his teenage years and while pursuing his MBA in Finance at the University of Chicago. In 1992, at age 24, Anderson opened the first two Pancheros locations using capital he had earned from the stock market. He chose Iowa City because of his familiarity with the University of Iowa campus through friends and family members who had attended the school. The East Lansing location near Michigan State University was opened simultaneously to establish the brand at multiple Big Ten college campuses.

The first nine locations opened in similar midwestern college towns, establishing a pattern of targeting university-adjacent markets with late-night hours to serve students after bars closed.

=== Menu evolution and innovations ===
Originally modeled closely after Chicago taquerias, Pancheros simplified its menu and introduced its signature fresh-pressed tortillas in 1998. This revamp included the addition of a dough press and updated restaurant decor with a more upscale appearance.

In 2002, Pancheros introduced the practice of mixing burrito ingredients together before rolling, using a small plastic spatula. This technique was intended to distribute ingredients evenly throughout the burrito, ensuring consistent flavor in every bite. The mixing tool was later branded as "Bob the Tool" and introduced to customers as a mascot on April 1, 2007. The company's marketing describes Bob as having "single-handedly revolutionized burrito building, and eating, forever."

=== Franchise expansion ===
An interior view of a Pancheros

In 2003, Pancheros opened its first non-corporate (franchised) location, marking the beginning of its franchise expansion. By 2002, the ninth company-operated restaurant had opened and franchising was beginning to take off.

The chain expanded steadily through the 2000s and 2010s, primarily in midwestern markets. Pancheros entered New Jersey in 2008 and has since made the Northeast a priority market for growth, with locations in Pennsylvania, Connecticut, and Massachusetts.

The original East Lansing location, one of the two founding restaurants, closed in May 2016. Company spokesperson Stephanie Travis stated that the building no longer met the company's standards, and that Pancheros was "actively searching for a new location in downtown East Lansing." A separate Lansing-area location, which opened in 2002, continues to operate.

In 2022, the company celebrated its 30th anniversary and announced it expected to reach $100 million in sales by the end of October that year. The chain reported rising brand-wide sales for a fourth consecutive year in 2024, with an average unit volume of approximately $1.56 million in 2023.

== Products ==
Pancheros serves burritos, tacos, quesadillas, burrito bowls, and salads. All menu items can be customized with a choice of proteins including marinated grilled steak, slow-roasted seasoned pork carnitas, chili-tamarind marinated chicken, or grilled vegetables.

The chain emphasizes fresh preparation, claiming to use no fryers or freezers. Salsas, guacamole, and queso dips are made on-site daily. The queso has developed a notable following among customers.

== Competition ==
Pancheros competes in the fast casual Mexican segment alongside larger chains such as Chipotle Mexican Grill, Qdoba, and Moe's Southwest Grill. The company has distinguished itself from competitors through its fresh-pressed tortillas and ingredient-mixing technique. The chain's Vice President of Franchise Operations, Saúl Muñiz, previously worked at Chipotle Mexican Grill for over two decades before joining Pancheros.

== Recognition ==
In 2006, Sports Illustrated named Pancheros the most popular place to eat when bars in Iowa City close.

Pancheros was included in Franchise Times' 2023 list of 400 fastest-growing franchises, leading growth in the Mexican category alongside Bubbakoo's Burritos.

== See also ==
- List of Mexican restaurants
