= Kistler Vineyards =

Winery located in California, USA

Coordinates: 38°27′36″N 122°51′37″W

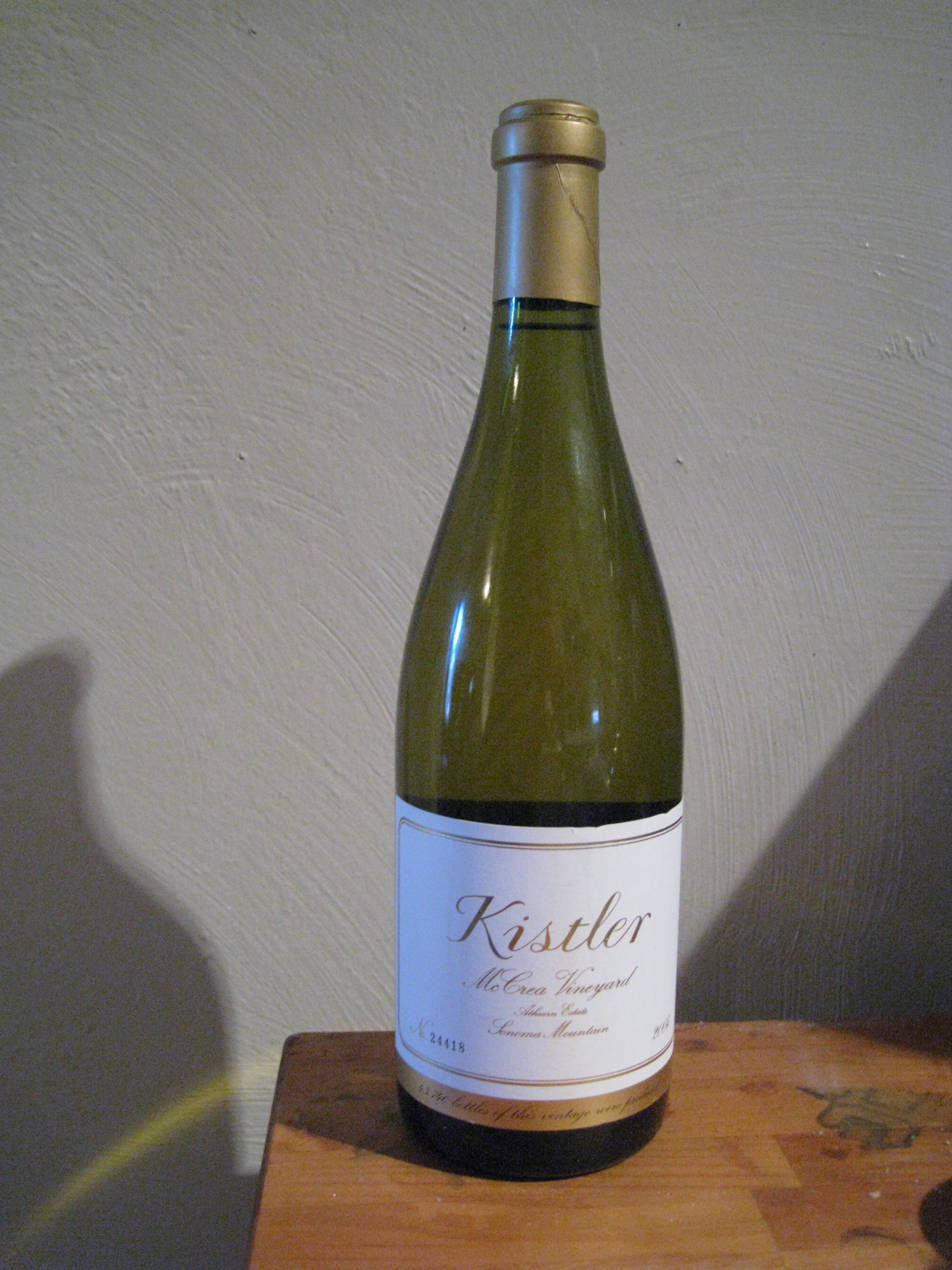
A bottle of Kistler Chardonnay

Kistler Vineyards is a family-owned California winery located in Northern California's wine producing region of Sonoma County. According to Food and Wine Magazine, their "biannual release of Chardonnay is one of the most sought after by wine enthusiasts" and Food and Wine Magazine's Wine Guide considers their Chardonnays the "Best of the Best" among "Star Producers"

== History ==
Kistler was founded in 1978, and continues to be family owned and operated today. Until 2017 Kistler's winemaking was supervised by Steve Kistler, who studied creative writing at Stanford University. Kistler also oversaw the vineyard work. Mark Bixler, who has a PhD in Chemistry from the University of California at Berkeley ran the business and sales side of the winery as well as helping in the lab.

In 2008, Kistler sold his majority stake in the company to the owner of Durell Vineyard, Bill Price. At that time they brought the Vineyard Manager from Hudson Vineyards in Carneros, Jason Kesner, as Steve's assistant winemaker, with the intention of a long transitional period. That plan came to fruition at the end of 2017 with Jason now overseeing all production, farming, and day-to-day business.

In 2014, Kistler opened its first tasting facility at its Trenton Roadhouse property - a 60 acre vineyard.

== Grape varieties and wine ==
In addition to Chardonnay, Kistler Vineyards also produces different bottlings of Pinot noir from different vineyards, like the nearby Occidental Station and Bodega Headlands and in prior vintages Terra de Promissio. Like the Chardonnay, the Pinot noir is modeled after the wines of the Burgundy region of France.
