= Californians Against Hate =

American non-profit organization

- U.S. State of California
- Formation: 2008
- Type: 501(c)(4) nonprofit
- Location: Los Angeles, California
- Region served: California
- Key people: Fred Karger, president
- Website: www.californiansagainsthate.com

Californians Against Hate (CAH) is an American non-profit organization public-benefit corporation which works as a political watchdog organization. It was founded in 2008 to draw attention to the major donors to qualify and pass California’s Proposition 8. As the organization has grown, Californians Against Hate has evolved into leading boycotts of companies whose owners gave large contributions to Proposition 8. They have also filed complaints with two state ethics commissions that have led to investigations of the LDS Church in California and the National Organization for Marriage in Maine. Californians Against Hate has repeatedly called for a Congressional Investigation of the National Organization for Marriage due to its late and non reporting of its federal 990 income tax returns.

== History ==
Californians Against Hate was founded in July 2008 by Fred Karger, a long time Republican political consultant, in response to the large amounts of money flooding into Proposition 8.

== Boycotts ==
William Bolthouse gave $100,000 to Proposition 8. Californians Against Hate began a boycott against Bolthouse Farms, the company that William Bolthouse founded. The boycott was called off when Bolthouse Farms changed its corporate policy on domestic partnership benefits, and the company made matching contributions to various gay organizations, and promised to attain a 100% on HRC Corporate Equality Index.

San Diego developer, Doug Manchester donated $125,000 to Proposition 8. Manchester owns the Manchester Grand Hyatt Hotel, Southern California’s largest hotel. His early support of Proposition 8 caused an immediate response from gay-rights organizations including GLAAD, which canceled any events that were to be held at the hotel. Californians Against Hate initiated a boycott against the hotel on July 18, 2008, along with the hotel workers' union, Unite Here! Local 30. Even though Manchester is the owner and developer of the Manchester Grand Hyatt, the Global Hyatt Corporation has made an attempt to separate his views from that of the managing corporation. Californians Against Hate estimates that the boycott is costing the Hyatt property $1 million per month. Hotel Marketing Director, Kelly Commerford, confirmed that cancellations resulting directly from the boycott had cost the hotel $7 million just in the first 8 months. This figure does not include estimates for those who choose other accommodations due to the boycott.

Terry Caster owns A-1 Self Storage; he and his family donated a total of $693,000 to Proposition 8. Californians Against Hate called a boycott of A-1 Self Storage effective November 20, 2008.

== Elections Commissions ==
It has been reported by Mother Jones that the LDS Church first reported that it made only $2,087 worth of non-monetary contributions to Proposition 8. Californians Against Hate filed a formal complaint against the LDS Church with California Fair Political Practices Commission. According to this same article, a Church spokesperson claimed that the church had spent “zero dollars” on the campaign, but a few months later, the LDS Church changed this number to $190,000 in non-monetary. Californians Against Hate contends that the LDS Church spent millions more in non-monetary contributions. According to Stephanie Mencimer, California’s Election Commission continues to investigate the church.

In 2009, Californians Against Hate filed a formal complaint with the Internal Revenue Service (IRS) against the National Organization for Marriage, saying that NOM had refused to make its IRS 990 forms public, as required by law. CAH representatives went to "the Princeton, New Jersey, offices of the National Organization for Marriage twice to get copies of their IRS 990 reports, to no avail," said CAH's president, Fred Karger. "Then our representative, Ben Katzenberg, sent two certified letters to the NOM office on March 18, 2009, requesting its two 990 forms. Federal law requires NOM to furnish copies of these IRS filings within 30 days after the request has been received. And 40 days later, still no 990s."

A complaint filed by Californians Against Hate also led the Maine Commission on Governmental Ethics and Election Practices to launch an investigation of National Organization for Marriage. Maine law requires organizations that raise more than $5000 for a ballot question campaign file disclosure reports. NOM had contributed $1.6 million to Stand For Marriage Maine, as of October 23, 2009, without revealing its donor’s names. The commission approved an investigation on a 3–2 vote. NOM responded by filing suit, claiming that the state's election laws violate the Constitution of the United States. NOM used the likelihood of their suit's success as an argument to obtain a federal restraining order, which would keep them from having to provide donor names before the date of the election; the request was turned down by federal Judge David Brock Hornby. In January 2010, representatives of the group were subpoenaed to appear before the commission. In February, the group requested that those subpoenas be dropped, but the commission voted 4 to 1 to deny that request.

== See also ==
- LGBT rights in the United States
- List of LGBT rights organizations
- California Proposition 8
