= Bolthouse Farms =

Farm company in California, US

Wm. Bolthouse Farms, Inc.
- Trade name: Bolthouse Farms
- Type: Subsidiary
- Industry: Chilled juice; Smoothies/Shakes; Protein drinks; Salad dressings; Kombucha
- Founded: 1915 in Grant, Michigan
- Headquarters: Bakersfield, California
- Key people: Steve Cornell (Chief Executive Officer)
- Products: Chilled juice, smoothies, shakes, and protein drinks; Kombucha; Cold-pressed juice
- Parent: Madison Dearborn Partners (2005–2012); Campbell's (2012–2019); Butterfly Equity (2019–present)
- Website: bolthouse.com

Wm. Bolthouse Farms, Inc., doing business as Bolthouse Farms, founded 1915 in Grant, Michigan, is a vertically integrated farm company specializing in refrigerated beverages, salad dressings, and baby carrots. It is located in the San Joaquin Valley of California and is headquartered in Bakersfield, California in Kern County. The company operates facilities in Prosser, Washington. Private equity firm Madison Dearborn Partners owned Bolthouse from 2005 to 2012, when it was bought by the Campbell's for US$1.55 billion. The company changed hands once again in June 2019, when Campbell sold it to Butterfly Equity.

== History ==
The farm was originally a "small muck-soil vegetable farm" until 1938 when William Herman Bolthouse took it over from his parents. At that point he expanded it and began to concentrate on the production and distribution of carrots. Under his leadership, in 1973, opened a second facility in Bakersfield, California, where year-round production was possible. His son William J. took over in 1985 upon his retirement. It stayed in family hands until shortly after the death of William Herman in 2004 at age 89.

Private equity firm Madison Dearborn Partners then owned Bolthouse from 2005 to 2012. It shut down all Michigan operations in June 2010. Campbell Soup Company acquired the company in 2012 for US$1.55 billion. In April 2019, Bolthouse Farms again fell in the hands of a private equity firm when it was bought from Campbell by an affiliate of Butterfly Equity for US$510 million.

In an effort to reduce the costs of preventative safety protocols for COVID-19 infections and to more quickly reach herd immunity within the company, Bolthouse secured vaccine doses from public health officials to be given directly to their workers. The company gave $500 in cash for full time hourly workers who had been vaccinated.

== Products ==
Green Goodness

Bolthouse mainly focuses on blended smoothie like beverages but also sells carrots. their juice lineup includes Green juice, Carrot juice, Mango juice, Breakfast smoothie,(And More) as well as some coffe flavors.

== Baby carrots marketing campaign ==
In September 2010, a marketing initiative was launched by a group of nearly 50 carrot producers led by Bolthouse Farms (calling themselves "A Bunch of Carrot Farmers") sought to promote baby-cut carrots as an alternative to junk food for children. The campaign mimicked tactics typically employed by snack food marketers, including snack-food-like packaging; futuristic, sexual, and extreme sports-themed TV commercials; carrot vending machines in schools; and an iPhone game and website. As of September 2016, the company markets packaged baby-cut carrots with cartoon mascots and spicing shakers under the name "Kids Veggie Snackers," including Carrot Meets Ranch (ranch dressing spices, cowboy carrot mascot) and Carrot Meets Chili Lime (cartoon hot pepper and carrot in romantic pairing).

== Carrot hot dogs ==
In 2020, Bolthouse Farms first cured and sold carrots to be grilled as carrot hot dogs. The grill-ready carrots are labeled Carrot Dogs and sold in 8 packs. The carrot hot dogs are sold in three flavors: Classic American-Style, Chorizo-Style and Sweet Italian-Style. The company at the same time added carrot fettucine and riced carrots. The products were launched to appeal to consumers' who want more plant-based foods.

== Carrot fiber product ==
In 2003, the U.S. Food and Drug Administration accepted Bolthouse Farms' self-certification that carrot fiber ingredient is generally recognized as safe (GRAS).

== 2006 health concerns ==
=== Carrot botulism outbreak ===
In September 2006, the Canadian Food Inspection Agency ordered a recall of Bolthouse Farms "100 per cent Carrot Juice" and other Bolthouse Farms products because of several cases of botulism resulting from consumption of the products. On September 29, 2006, the United States Food and Drug Administration (FDA) recommended that Georgia residents not purchase Bolthouse Farms carrot juice and warned consumers not to purchase Bolthouse Farms products stale-dated November 11, 2006, or earlier.

The warning and the recalls were due to reported cases of consumption of the beverages resulting in six cases of botulism in the United States and Canada. Two cases in Toronto, Ontario, Canada resulted in paralysis; three cases recorded in Georgia, United States resulted in respiratory failure, with the patients requiring ventilators; one case recorded in Florida resulted in hospitalization. The patient in Florida was last reported to be unresponsive since mid-September 2006.

In response, Bolthouse Farms said the people may have failed to properly refrigerate the products. Bolthouse Farms has subsequently released an FAQ regarding the event.

== 2024 company separation ==
In May of 2024 Bolthouse Farms was separated into two separate companies by its owner, Butterfly Equity. Bolthouse Fresh Foods continues its legacy as a leading supplier of fresh carrots while Generous Brands supplies premium fresh beverages and salad dressings.

== Relationship to the Bolthouse Foundation ==
The Bolthouse Foundation is a religious charity funding evangelical causes. Mr. and Mrs. William J. Bolthouse sold their interest in Wm. Bolthouse Farms in late 2005, and since then the Bolthouse Foundation has reflected their giving decisions exclusively. The Bolthouse Foundation is a separate entity from Bolthouse Farms, and all funding decisions by The Bolthouse Foundation are made solely by the Bolthouse Foundation. No members of The Bolthouse Foundation have a financial interest in Bolthouse Farms, and The Bolthouse Foundation receives neither financial support nor benefits from the profits of Bolthouse Farms.

The division of Bolthouse Farms and The Bolthouse Foundation became evident in October 2008 when an article in the Los Angeles Times announced that the boycott of Bolthouse Farms had ended. The advocacy group Californians Against Hate (CAH) had urged consumers not to support Bolthouse Farms. On October 9, 2008, CAH campaign manager Fred Karger issued a statement saying that the "Don't Buy Bolthouse" campaign had ended.
