= Red Star Rescue =

Red Star Rescue is a program run by the American Humane Association. The purpose of the program is to send volunteer responders to rescue animals in the event of a disaster, or from animal cruelty. The Red Star Rescue team is trained to handle a variety of catastrophes, and they carry resources to set up and operate temporary shelters. The team has nearly 200 volunteers nationwide. In the past five years, Red Star Rescue has saved and sheltered 64,000 pets.

== History ==
The Red Star Rescue project was initiated in 1916 after the War Department recruited the American Humane Association to help save hundreds of thousands of horses that were injured during World War I in Europe.

Red Star Rescue carried out animal rescue missions during the September 11 attacks, the 2010 Haiti earthquake, Hurricane Katrina, and Hurricane Sandy. During Hurricane Sandy, the American Humane Association's Red Star Rescue team delivered over 100,000 pounds of food, supplies, and medicine to the areas impacted by the storm.

In 2013, Red Star Rescue was invited by the State of Oklahoma to provide assistance in the aftermath of a tornado. The Red Star Rescue team covered more than 2,000 miles in a little over a day to reach the disaster scene.

An article in Pawcurious states that Red Star Rescue enlists, "exceptionally well trained animal rescue providers" that "provide invaluable support during disasters."

== Lois Pope Rescue Vehicle ==
In 2013, the American Humane Association introduced their new "Lois Pope Red Star Rescue Vehicle" to participate in Red Star Rescue efforts. The vehicle is a 50-foot long Ford F-350 with an emergency response trailer attached that is outfitted to provide a wide variety of emergency services.

Red Star Rescue also has an 82-foot truck in its fleet. the rig was used to rescue animals that were affected by Hurricane Sandy in Pennsylvania.

Red Star Rescue has vehicles equipped to shelter up to 100 animals that are regularly deployed in their rescue efforts.

== Work Against Animal Cruelty ==
Red Star Rescue performs large-scale operations to rescue animals from fighting rings and dangerous shelters.

In 2014, the New Jersey Society for the Prevention of Cruelty to Animals (NJSPCA) requested the services of Red Star Rescue to save animals following the receivership of a shelter in the borough of Helmetta. Red Star Rescue removed 100 cats and dogs from dangerous conditions. The animal shelter was quarantined by the department of health.

Red Star Rescue also took in 225 dogs following the breakup of a multi-state dogfighting operation with locations in Baltimore and West Virginia. 22 individuals were indicted for their role in the dog-fighting ring.
