= Mary Frances Lovell =

American writer and social reformer (1843–1932)

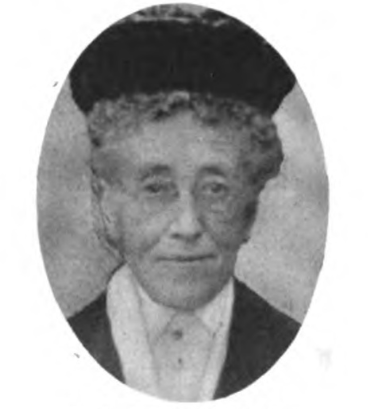
- Born: Mary Frances Whitechurch; 11 July 1843; London, England
- Died: 13 October 1932 (aged 89); Philadelphia, U.S.
- Occupations: Writer; social reformer
- Known for: Co-founding the American Anti-Vivisection Society
- Spouse: George S. Lovell (m. 1864)

Mary Frances Lovell (née Whitechurch; July 11, 1843 – September 13, 1932) was a British-born American writer, humanitarian, animal welfare and temperance advocate. She co-founded the American Anti-Vivisection Society (AAVS), and also, in 1859, the Women's Pennsylvania Society for the Prevention of Cruelty to Animals (WPSPCA), serving as the latter's corresponding secretary and honorary president. She served as vice-president of the American Humane Association and through her work with the World's Woman's Christian Temperance Union (WWCTU), her humanitarian efforts were introduced into some 20 countries around the world.

== Early life and education ==
Mary Frances Whitechurch was born in London, England, on July 11, 1843. (Note: According to Biddle & Lowrie (2016), Mary was born in 1844.) Her father, Robert Whitechurch, was an engraver.

She came to the United States in early 1849, where she was educated in private schools.

== Career ==
Lovell joined the Woman's Christian Temperance Union (WCTU) at Bryn Mawr, Pennsylvania, in 1885. To her astonishment, she was immediately elected superintendent of the department of scientific temperance instruction in schools and colleges for the Bryn Mawr WCTU. For several years, she was actively associated with Mary H. Hunt, of the National WCTU, in her work for scientific temperance' instruction in the public schools. Due to the prolonged illness of her husband, Lovell was obliged in 1897 to resign temporarily from active WCTU work.

From childhood, Lovell had a love of animals and a hatred for any sort of cruelty. While at Bryn Mawr, she became a member of the WPSPCA. Later, she became a member of the AAVS, vice-president of the American Humane Association, and associate editor of the Journal of Zoöphily. She was the chairman of the American Humane Association's Humane Sunday and Be Kind to Animals Week Movement.

Her discoveries of the cruelties of vivisection aroused in Lovell a desire to advance humane education everywhere as rapidly as possible, and the thought came to her to create a Band of Mercy Department as part of the work of the WCTU. She proposed the plan in the Bryn Mawr Union, and it was successfully adopted there. She next wrote a paper entitled "Why the Band of Mercy Should Form a Part of the work of the WCTU", which she read at a convention of the WCTU of Montgomery County, Pennsylvania. It was ordered printed and was shortly published in The Union Signal, the organ of the National WCTU. At her request, the Pennsylvania WCTU created in 1888 a Department of Mercy, and at the State convention, she was elected its superintendent, having had previous experience in the same capacity for her county union. After existing for two years as a State department only, a national Department of Mercy was created, and Lovell was chosen its superintendent also. In this office, she secured the adoption of the Department of Mercy (later, the Department of Humane Education) in 44 States of the Union.

Lovell was also the World's Woman's Christian Temperance Union (WWCTU) superintendent of the Department of Mercy, the department having been adopted by the WWCTU convention in London in 1895. Margaret Marshall Saunders was made the first superintendent, but, upon her resignation, Lovell succeeded to the position. (Note: According to Cherrington (1928), Lovell was placed at the head of the World WCTU's Department of Mercy in June 1889.) Thus her humanitarian efforts were introduced into some 20 countries around the world.

== Personal life and death ==
Lovell was a vegetarian and non fur-wearer. On September 13, 1864, she married George S. Lovell, of Brimfield, Massachusetts, a wholesale clock dealer. Lovell resided at Jenkintown, Pennsylvania.

In recognition of Lovell's services in humane educational work, her portrait in oil was presented to the WPSPCA in December 1923, a gift and work of Mary J. Eddy, of Rhode Island.

Mary Frances Lovell died in Philadelphia, on June 25, 1932.

== Selected works ==
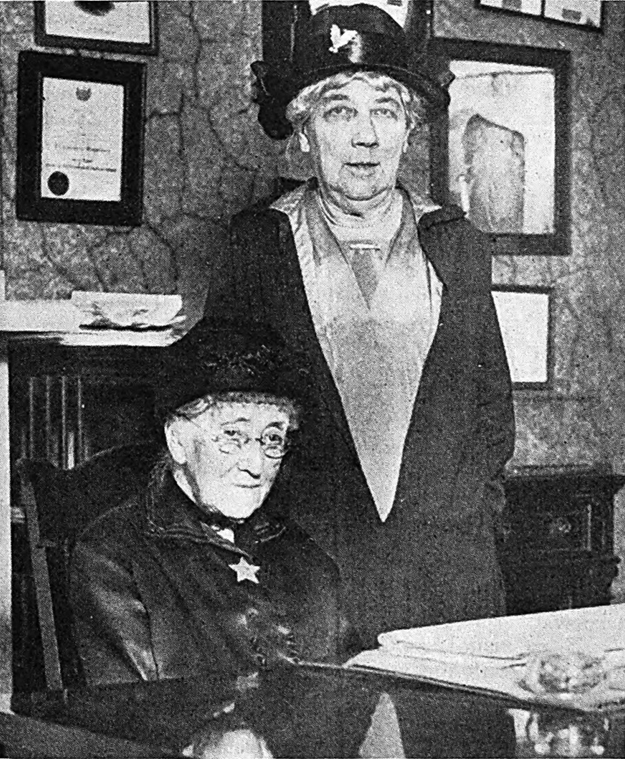
Lovell (left) with Lida H. Ashbridge in 1928

- "Why the Band of Mercy Should Form a Part of the work of the W.C.T.U."
- "Prayer"
- "The Path of the Just"
- "The Ideal Woman"
- "What is Humane Education?"
- "Is Vivisection Philanthropy?"
- "The Fur Trade"
- "Slaughtering"

== Quotes ==
Is the torture of living animals for the alleged or possible benefit of humanity right or wrong? It is wrong to torture a man, because he has a sensitive body and can suffer. It is wrong to torture an animal for the same reason. "But a man is worth more than an animal". Which man? The brilliant statesman, the noble philanthropist, the learned philosopher are "worth more" than the idiot, the criminal or the pauper. Shall the latter be tortured for the possible benefit of the former? Are the miserable degenerates of humanity worth as much to their fellow-men as some of the nobler brutes? The real worth of any man lies in his moral integrity. No man is worth more than a brute if he would have that brute or his inferior fellow-man tortured for his sake.

— Mary Frances Lovell, in 1902
