= TSG Consumer Partners =

American private equity company

TSG Consumer Partners, LP
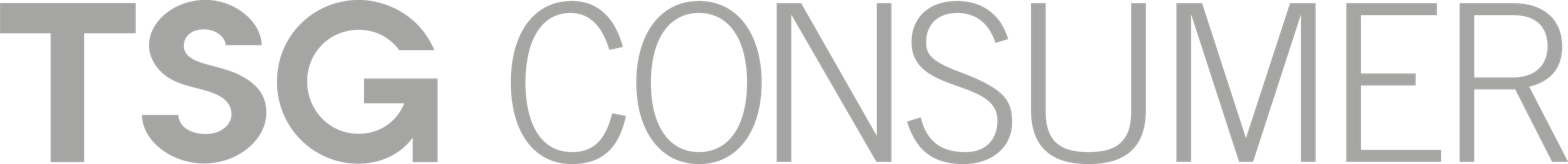
- Company type: Private
- Industry: Private equity, Consumer products
- Predecessor: The Shansby Group
- Founded: 1986; 40 years ago
- Headquarters: Larkspur, California, United States
- Key people: Charles H. Esserman (Chief Executive Officer and Co-Founder), Jamie O'Hara (President), Hadley Mullin (Senior Managing Director)
- Products: Growth capital focused on consumer-facing businesses
- AUM: US$20 billion
- Number of employees: 60
- Website: www.tsgconsumer.com

TSG Consumer Partners is an American private equity company based in San Francisco, California. The firm was founded in 1986, and was among the first private equity firms to invest exclusively in consumer companies.

The firm also has offices in New York City, Stamford, Connecticut, and London.

== History ==
The Shansby Group logo in use prior to 2005

The firm was founded in 1986 as the Montgomery Consumer Fund, a partnership with an initial equity interest from Montgomery Securities. In 1988 the firm's founders, J. Gary Shansby and Charles H. Esserman, repurchased Montgomery Securities' interest and renamed the company The Shansby Group. The firm changed its name to TSG Consumer Partners in 2005 when Esserman became CEO. Shansby left the firm in 2005 to focus on philanthropic projects as well as health issues. In March 2012, Jamie O’Hara was named President at TSG and Hadley Mullin was named Senior Managing Director in September 2014.

The firm has been noted as an anomaly in the private equity industry for its high percentage of female employees: 50 percent of employees are women, compared to 13.7% of private equity professionals in North America. In its most recent fund, TSG reported a net return of 50 percent, more than double the industry average.

In March 2019, TSG opened an office in London, the firm’s first office outside the U.S.

== Investments ==
The firm is one of the largest and oldest private equity firms primarily focused on growth capital investments in early-stage and well-established consumer companies.

TSG has invested across a number of consumer categories, including food and beverages, ecommerce, personal care, beauty, outdoor, automotive, pet care products and consumer technology.

Among TSG's most notable past and present investments are well-known companies such as Backcountry.com, Canyon Bicycles, and Duckhorn.

== Funds ==
TSG closed its sixth fund, TSG6, in November 2011 with $1.3 billion. The seventh fund in the sequence, TSG7A and TSG7B, closed in November 2015 with $2.5 billion.

The firm closed its eighth fund, TSG8 LP, in February 2019 with $4 billion. The firm has approximately $10 billion in equity capital under management as of December 2020.

The firm closed its ninth fund, TSG9 LP, in January 2023 with $6 billion. The firm has approximately $20 billion in equity capital under management as of January 2023.
