= American Humane Society =

American animal and child welfare organization

- Formation: October 9, 1877; 149 years ago
- Type: Non-profit
- Purpose: Animal welfare, child welfare
- Locations: Washington, D.C.; Los Angeles
- Region served: United States
- Revenue: $68,000,000
- Staff: 143
- Website: americanhumane.org

The American Humane Society (previously American Humane), is an American animal welfare organization founded in 1877 committed to ensuring the safety, welfare, and well-being of animals. It was previously called the International Humane Association and subsequently the American Humane Association and American Humane before changing its name to American Humane Society in 2025. In 1940, it became the sole monitoring body for the humane treatment of animals on the sets of unionized Hollywood films and other broadcast productions, a role it maintains through an agreement with the Screen Actors Guild. American Humane Society is best known for its certification mark "No Animals Were Harmed", which appears at the end of film or television credits where animals are featured.

The organization also rescues animals following natural disasters, and runs programs that certify farms, zoos, and aquariums, among other institutions for the humane treatment of animals.

American Humane Society is headquartered in Washington, D.C. It is a section 501(c)(3) nonprofit organization.

== History ==
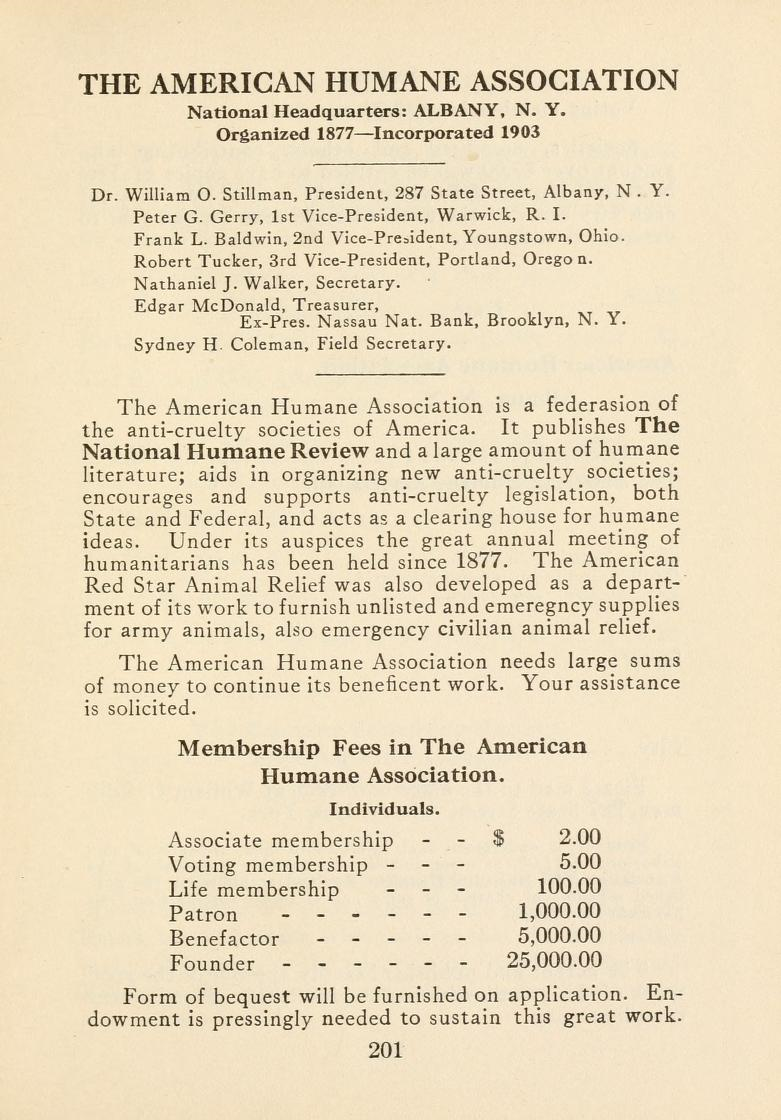
The American Humane Association, 1919

American Humane Society began on October 9, 1877, as the International Humane Association, with the amalgamation of 27 organizations from across the United States after a meeting at the Kennard House in Cleveland, Ohio. The invitation to the other groups came from the Illinois Humane Society, sent on September 15, 1877, to discuss the specific problem of farm animal maltreatment during their transport between the eastern and western US. Groups attending the meeting included associations from the State of New York, Illinois, Ohio, Pennsylvania, Michigan, Maryland, Connecticut, and New Hampshire. A group from Minnesota also pledged its support to the forthcoming results of the conference, though they could not attend, and a group from the Canadian province of Quebec requested that a transcript of the proceedings be sent to them afterward.

The International Humane Association changed its name to the "American Humane Association" in November 1878. New member organizations were in attendance for their second annual general meeting, held in Baltimore, Maryland, and also came from California, Massachusetts, Maine, Delaware, and the District of Columbia. Canadian regions were also included in the Association. From 1892 to 1900, Francis H. Rowley was Secretary of the American Humane Association.

In 1916, American Humane Society founded Red Star Rescue Relief after the U.S. Secretary of War asked the organization to rescue injured horses on the battlefields of World War I. Officers in 1917 included President William O. Stillman and 2nd Vice-President Peter G. Gerry. There were 36 Vice-Presidents listed including William Howard Taft, Thomas R. Marshall, and Francis H. Rowley.

American Humane Society began its work in film in 1940 after an incident that occurred on the set of the film Jesse James. The group began protesting the public release of the film because of a scene in which a horse was forced to run off the edge of a cliff. The horse fell over 70 feet to the ground below and broke its spine, having to be put down afterwards. In 1966, American Humane Society's access to some sets was diminished for 14 years following the dismantling of the Hays Office, during which time their jurisdiction was lessened.

In 1954, tensions within the ranks of American Humane Society members came to a head at the organization's annual meeting, as a member-nominated slate of board candidates stood for office in opposition to a board-nominated slate. The majority of those assembled at the Atlanta, Georgia convention elected the three candidates on the member-nominated slate; J. Perry, Raymond Naramore, and Roland Smith. In the meeting's aftermath, there were firings and resignations on the part of staff members, including Larry Andrews, Marcia Glaser, Helen Jones, and Fred Myers. This core group went on to found a new organization, the National Humane Society, later known as The Humane Society of the United States, as an alternative to American Humane Society.

American Humane Society's first "No Animals Were Harmed" end credit was issued at the end of the movie The Doberman Gang in 1972. Since then, the group has launched programs to certify the humane treatment of animals at a wide variety of institutions.

In 1980, following the release of Heaven's Gate, the opening of which was met with a national picketing and protest effort after complaints about how the filming of the movie had involved the inhumane treatment of animals – including the deaths of five horses – the Screen Actors Guild negotiated for the universal presence of American Humane Society on the set as part of its union deal, forcing filmmakers to contact American Humane Society in advance of any animal being present on set.

In 2000, the American Humane Certified Farm program created the first farm animal welfare label to be overseen by the U.S. Department of Agriculture. The program began as "Free Farmed" under Adele Douglass and is now referred to as the American Humane Certified Farm Program.

In 2025, the organization changed its name to "American Humane Society".

== Programs ==
=== No Animals Were Harmed Certification ===
The American Humane Society's No Animals Were Harmed certification program oversees animals used during unionized media productions, and it is sanctioned by the Screen Actors Guild to oversee a production's humane care of animals. It is the only organization with jurisdiction to do so within the United States. Because of this, the society may choose to issue the end credit disclaimer "No Animals Were Harmed", with a piece of a filmstrip that depicts a dog, a horse and an elephant. American Humane Society also reports on animal safety during filming if public concerns arise or if animal accidents happen on the set. American Humane Society protects the animals on the set as well as the cast/crew members who interact with the animals.

The society's standard of animal care was established in 1988 and continues to evolve. It covers all living creatures. On the set, representatives attempt to ensure the guidelines are upheld. American Humane Society's oversight includes film, television, commercials, music videos, and internet productions.

The Screen Actors Guild – and thus the American Humane Society – have no jurisdiction concerning non-American and non-union productions.

In 2024, American Humane Society reported supervising 1,000 productions in 25 countries, protecting 100,000 animal actors.

It's possible to see and search for the certification of a past film production or currently-released film productions through their Humane Hollywood website.

==== Standards ====
American Humane currently has four certifications with unique qualifications, which are as follow:

•Full Certification: American Humane's Safety Representatives were on set to ensure the safety of the animals throughout production. After a screening of the finished product and cross-checking all animal action, American Humane determines the film met or exceeded Guidelines for the Safe Use of Animals in Filmed Media and, is awarded the end credit disclaimer "No Animals Were Harmed."

•Modified Certification: American Humane's Safety Representatives were not able to monitor every scene in which animals appeared. However, American Humane oversaw significant animal action filmed in compliance with American Humane's Guidelines for the Safe Use of Animals in Filmed Media. After screening the finished product and cross-checking all animal action supervised during production, American Humane acknowledges that the filmmakers have cooperated fully with their process.

•Not Monitored: The production did not seek monitoring oversight from American Humane's Safety Representatives during filming and American Humane cannot attest to the treatment of the animal actors or know whether American Humane's Guidelines for the Safe Use of Animals in Filmed Media were followed.

•Special Circumstances: The current definition of this is unknown and is only described as special circumstances. Previously, in the former rating system, it was given when productions followed guidelines and there was cooperation with representatives, and yet, an incident occurred (injury, death, etc.) and it was determined the production or animal suppliers had no negligence or malice.

The previous ratings system that was used had the following ratings: Outstanding, Acceptable, Special Circumstances, Unacceptable, Production Compliant, and Not Monitored.

=== Certified Farm Program ===
American Humane Society certifies farms after evaluating them in five criteria. The animals are expected to be free from hunger, discomfort, pain, and fear, and able to express normal behaviors. Farms that meet these criteria receive an American Humane Certified label. As of 2024, the American Humane Society reported that its farm program certifies nearly 200 producers and processors, represents 90 percent of cage-free-eggs sold in the U.S., and covers more than one billion farm animals.

=== Certified Zoos & Aquariums ===
The American Humane Society also certifies zoos, aquariums, and conservation parks for the humane treatment of animals. The benchmarks in which facilities are judged are developed by the organization's Scientific Advisory Committee. As of 2024, the American Humane Society certifies 85 zoos, aquariums, and conservation parks across 17 countries.

=== Hero Dog Awards ===
Each year a dog is awarded the Hero Dog Award, an accolade given to dogs that have contributed substantially to human society. There are several categories in which dogs can be nominated, including the Military Dog category. The grand prize for the American Hero Dog was previously reported to be $10,000, which is given to a charity that reflects the contributions of the animal. In 2011 and 2012 the awards were broadcast on the Hallmark Channel. The first winner of the national award was a dog named Roselle, who led his blind owner down from the 78th floor of the World Trade Center during the September 11 attacks. There were more than 400,000 votes cast in the online poll that determined the winner. Roselle died several months before the winner was announced. The award was given on November 11, 2011.

=== Red Star Rescue ===
According to The Gettysburg Times, the "American Humane Association began offering animal relief in August 1916, by accepting an invitation of the War Department to help animals used by the U.S. Army during WWI. The invitation resulted in the development of the American Red Star Animal Relief Program later known as Red Star Rescue Relief. Since its inception, the American Humane Association's Red Star Animal Emergency Services has responded to national and international disasters, rescuing thousands of animals." Now called the American Humane Society Red Star Animal Rescue, disasters in which the group has rescued animals include the 2011 Joplin tornado, Hurricane Katrina, the 2010 Haiti earthquake, Hurricane Sandy, the 2011 Tōhoku earthquake and tsunami, and the September 11 attacks.

American Humane Society have units stationed across the country to rescue animals in crisis. It includes emergency response vehicles customized to help animals in disasters, as well as rescue equipment designed for animal search and rescue.

=== Child Welfare ===
American Humane Society previously managed initiatives to improve child welfare services. The Front Porch Project was launched in 1997 to prevent child abuse and neglect. Meanwhile, the Fatherhood Initiative helped to develop better methods of engaging non-resident fathers with children who are in the welfare system.

=== Military Working Dog Reunification ===
American Humane Society operates a program that reunites retired military working dogs with their former handlers. American Humane Society pays to transport the dogs to the former handlers and covers veterinary care for the dogs for the remainder of their lives. This program was formalized in 2021, when American Humane Society created an official Military Working Dog Reunification Fund.

=== Pups4Patriots ===
American Humane Society operates the Pups4Patriots program, which connects veterans and first responders suffering from Post-Traumatic Stress and Traumatic Brain Injury with service dogs. American Humane Society pays the associated training and adoption costs for the veteran and first responder recipients of the program. The program has provided approximately 300 dogs to veterans and first responders in total.

=== Global Humane Society ===
Global Humane Society is the international brand of American Humane Society. Global Humane Society has a certification program for international zoos, aquariums, and tourism destinations. Global Humane Society awards the annual Wolfgang Kiessling International Prize for Species Conservation to someone who makes a significant contribution to conservation. The group also oversees a nature preserve in South Africa, where it operates a rewilding program. Prior to 2025, Global Humane Society was known as Global Humane.

== Governance and finances ==
American Humane Society's budget for 2024 was just over $65 million. Their total revenue during that same year was $68.5 million.

The organization closed its Denver, Colorado office in 2011 and moved its operations to Washington, D.C.

Previous board chair, Eric Bruner, resigned in January 2013 amidst revelations that American Humane Society paid $233,863 to his business partner, Gregory Dew, for unspecified consulting services. Dew was the highest paid American Humane "independent contractor" in the fiscal year that ended June 30, 2011, according to filings the charity submitted to the IRS.

== People ==
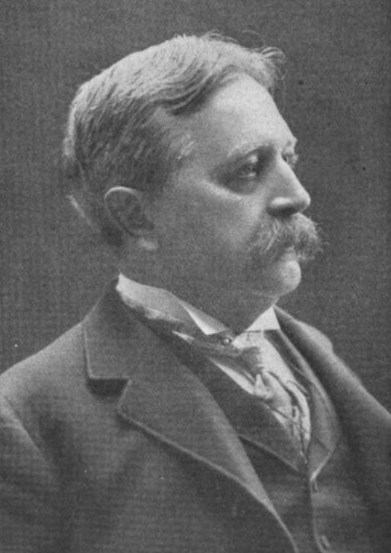
John G. Shortall

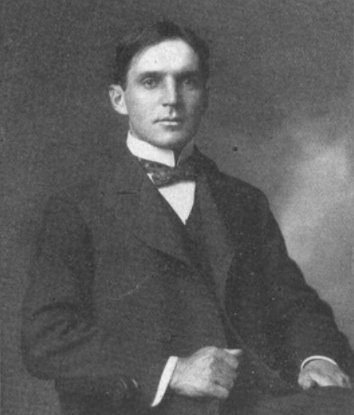
John L. Shortall

- James Brown
- John G. Shortall (1837–1908), president (1884–1885, 1892–1898)
- John L. Shortall
- Nora Trueblood Gause (1851–1955), recipient, "American Humane Award" (1952)
- Elbridge T. Gerry, III president (1888)
- Peter G. Gerry
- Mary Frances Lovell, vice-president
- Francis H. Rowley, secretary (1892–1900)
- Albert Leffingwell, M.D., president (1904)
- William Olin Stillman, president (1904–1924)
- Frank L. Baldwin, vice president (1923)
- Robin Ganzert, president and CEO (since 2010)

Other organization staff include program leaders that oversee the operations of initiatives ranging from No Animals Were Harmed to zoo and aquarium certifications.

== Criticism ==
In the late 1980s, American Humane Society was accused by Bob Barker and the United Activists for Animal Rights of condoning animal cruelty on the set of Project X and in several other media projects. The basis of the accusation was the allowing of a cattle prod and a gun on set, and the rumored beating of the chimpanzee on set. American Humane Society responded by launching a $10 million suit for libel, slander and invasion of privacy against Barker. American Humane Society claimed that there had been a two-year "vendetta" against them behind the accusations. In a series of public advertisements along with the $10 million libel suit, American Humane Society stated that the allegations were made based on insufficient and misleading information. The suit was eventually settled by Barker's insurance company, which paid American Humane Society $300,000.

Los Angeles Times reported, in 2001, that the American Humane Society Film Unit "has been slow to criticize cases of animal mistreatment, yet quick to defend the big-budget studios it is supposed to police," and that an examination of American Humane Society "also raises questions about the association's effectiveness." The article cites numerous cases of animals injured during filming which the American Humane Society may have overlooked.

In late 2013, The Hollywood Reporter ran a story which implicated American Humane Society in turning a blind eye to and underreporting incidents of animal abuse on television and movie sets. For example, during the filming of The Hobbit: An Unexpected Journey, 27 animals died. Nevertheless, the movie received a "No Animals Were Harmed" disclaimer. During the filming of the movie Life of Pi, the tiger "King" nearly drowned in a pool, yet this incident was not reported outside of the American Humane Society organization.

In early 2017, CNN reported that American Humane Society's representative for the movie A Dog's Purpose failed to properly monitor and protect a dog used in the film. American Humane Society placed an employee on leave after a video was published showing the dog in distress while performing a stunt for the movie. A third-party report later found that the video was "deliberately edited for the purpose of misleading the public and stoking public outrage."

== Publications ==
The American Humane Society published The National Humane Review beginning in 1913. From 1976 to 1978, the publication appeared under the title American Humane Magazine. It was issued quarterly by the organization's Animal Protection Division.

The society publishes an annual report and newsletter. They have released books and publications including:

- The Humane Table: Cooking with Compassion (2022)
- Mission Metamorphosis: Leadership in a Humane World (2020)
- Animal Stars: Behind the Scenes with Your Favorite Animal Actors (2014)
- Pet Meets Baby (2011)

== See also ==
- Animals in film and television

== Sources ==
- Coleman, Sydney. Humane Society Leaders in America (Albany: American Humane Association, 1924).
