= Humane Farm Animal Care =

American non-profit organization

- Founded: 2003
- Type: Non-profit organization
- Purpose: Animal welfare, humane animal husbandry practices
- Location: Middleburg, Virginia, US
- Region served: US
- Key people: Adele Douglass, executive director
- Website: certifiedhumane.org

Humane Farm Animal Care is a nonprofit organization established to promote and administer its certification and labeling program, Certified Humane Raised & Handled, for meat, dairy, eggs and poultry raised under its animal care standards in the US. It is governed by a board of directors and retains a scientific committee which includes scientists and veterinarians. The organization is endorsed by the American Society for the Prevention of Cruelty to Animals.

== History ==
Both the organization and the Certified Humane Raised & Handled program were founded in 2003, by Adele Douglass. In the late 1990s, Douglass had traveled to England to study a brand of farm products which advertised as derived from humanely raised animals. Certified Humane was influenced by the RSPCA Assured scheme.

== Mission ==
Humane Farm Animal Care's mission is "improving the lives of farm animals in food production from birth through slaughter."

== "Certified Humane Raised and Handled" program ==
The certification program requires the inspection of aspects of production, including raising of live animals, slaughter and the processing/packaging of animal products, to ensure the authenticity of the Certified Humane Raised & Handled label. The program provides documents detailing certification program requirements and specifications, as well as standards for animal care and slaughter. The program is ISO Guide 65 accredited (the USDA is the accrediting agency in the US).

HFAC says that its label "creates a win-win-win situation for retailers, producers, and consumers." Animal rights philosopher Gary L. Francione criticizes this as promoting the idea "that animal interests should be protected if and only if there is an economic benefit for humans in doing so". Francione says that "linking animal welfare with efficient exploitation is inconsistent with the recognition of the inherent value of nonhumans" and connects the label with broader trends in the animal movement.

== See also ==
- American Humane Certified
