= Australian Eggs =

Australian producer-owned corporation marketing eggs

Australian Egg Corporation
- Type: Agricultural corporation
- Founded: 2002
- Headquarters: 107 Mount Street, North Sydney, Sydney, Australia

Australian Eggs (AE) is the major marketer of eggs in Australia. It is a producer-owned corporation, representing approximately 400 commercial egg producers and is based in Sydney. The activities of AE include marketing, research and development, and policy services. According to its website, it runs public awareness campaigns on animal welfare, nutrition, and vaccine development. However, it has received criticism from animal welfare organisations for using these terms for promotional purposes. The corporation is affiliated with the International Egg Commission (IEC).

AE was created by an act of federal parliament in 2002 as a statutory authority to replace the Rural Industries Research and Development Corporation, as the peak egg body in the country.

In September 2004, the corporation hosted the Annual Conference of the IEC in Sydney. It was awarded the International body's most prestigious prize, the Golden Egg Award. At the same presentation night, the Australian egg industry was judged as the best in the world by an international judging panel.

In July 2005, the corporation funded a trip for Brian Spotts of Colorado, to break the world record of standing eggs on end.

In 2013, consumer rights organisation Choice made a super-complaint against AE after it proposed to change the definition for free range eggs in Australia from 2,000 hens per hectare to 10,000 hens per hectare. In 2014, AE was fined $30,000 for faking an egg shortage during an oversupply to boost their profits.
