= American Humane Certified =

American animal welfare certification program

The American Humane Certified program is the nation's first independent, third-party certification program to verify the humane treatment of farm animals and zoo animals. The program was launched in 2000 by the American Humane Society, formerly the American Humane Association.

The purpose of the American Humane Certified program is to give consumers access to humanely-raised food choices. Farms that meet the American Humane Association's criteria may add the American Humane Certified logo to their packaging.

== Certification process ==
In order to receive the American Humane Certified logo, farms must pass an assessment based on a list of over 200 standards. The standards are unique for each farm animal species.

The American Humane Association uses independent firms to perform annual audits on certified farms in order to ensure they are complying with the guidelines. The audits can be unannounced.

The American Humane Association standards specify that animals must be raised in an environment that limits stress, includes the provision of fresh water, a healthy diet, sufficient space, proper facilities, shelter, and a resting area. These criteria are rooted in the "five freedoms" that are used to evaluate animal welfare in the UK.

The certification is not granted to farmers who use growth hormones.

The standards are regularly reviewed by a scientific advisory committee.

== Program results ==
In 2014, the American Humane Association announced that it had certified one billion animals on more than 8,000 farms. 90 percent of cage-free eggs sold in the US have been certified by the American Humane Association. In 2014, turkey producer Butterball became an American Humane Certified producer. Other producers include The Happy Egg Company, Foster Farms, and Clover Organic Farms.

Consumer support for humanely raised food has increased since the start of the program.

While Consumer Reports rates American Humane Certified as “Good,” it notes that there are several important drawbacks and limitations to this certification. One major issue is the farms do not have to allow animals to express normal behaviors; some animals may be crated or caged (and Consumer Reports therefore lists swine and laying hen standards as “fair”), and animals cannot graze. Another limitation is the farm does not have to meet all the standards to get certified: “A farm can be certified if it meets 85 percent of the criteria at the time of inspection, but the consumer has no way of knowing which criteria were met and which were not”. Furthermore, farms are allowed to physically alter the animals without providing pain relief.

According to animal welfare group Farm Forward, American Humane Certified is a certification closely tied with the farming industry it claims to oversee and is used as a marketing tool. Because AHC relies on fees generated from its certifications to maintain its operations, there is a strong disincentive for AHC to set animal welfare standards higher than what its biggest customers have already adopted, lest it risk losing revenue. As a result, Farm Forward asserts that AHC is structurally disincentivized to improve animal welfare for the producers it certifies.

== Criticism ==
In June 2015, Mercy for Animals released a video of an undercover investigation of American Humane Certified factory, operated by Foster Farms. The footage included workers treating the chickens violently and inhumane slaughter methods; this resulted in Mercy for Animals calling the program "a scam".

According to Consumer Reports, "while the American Humane Association says its standards aim to ensure the humane treatment and improve the welfare of farm animals, the requirements fall short in meeting consumer expectations for a “humane” label in many ways. Most Americans think that a “humane” label should mean that the animals had adequate living space (86%), went outdoors (78%) and were raised without cages (66%). The American Humane Certified standards do not always assure consumers that these basic requirements were met. For example, minimum space requirements are sometimes greater than the industry norm, but do not always allow for freedom of movement. Animals such as chickens, pigs and turkeys can be continually confined indoors; female pigs with their newborn piglets can even be confined in barren crates that do not allow the mother pig to turn around, much less engage in natural and instinctive nesting behaviors. For beef cattle and dairy cows, grazing on pasture is not required and feedlots are allowed."

They have also been heavily criticized for certifying other corporations guilty of numerous animal cruelty cases such as Butterball.
