= William O. Stillman =

American physician and writer

William Olin Stillman
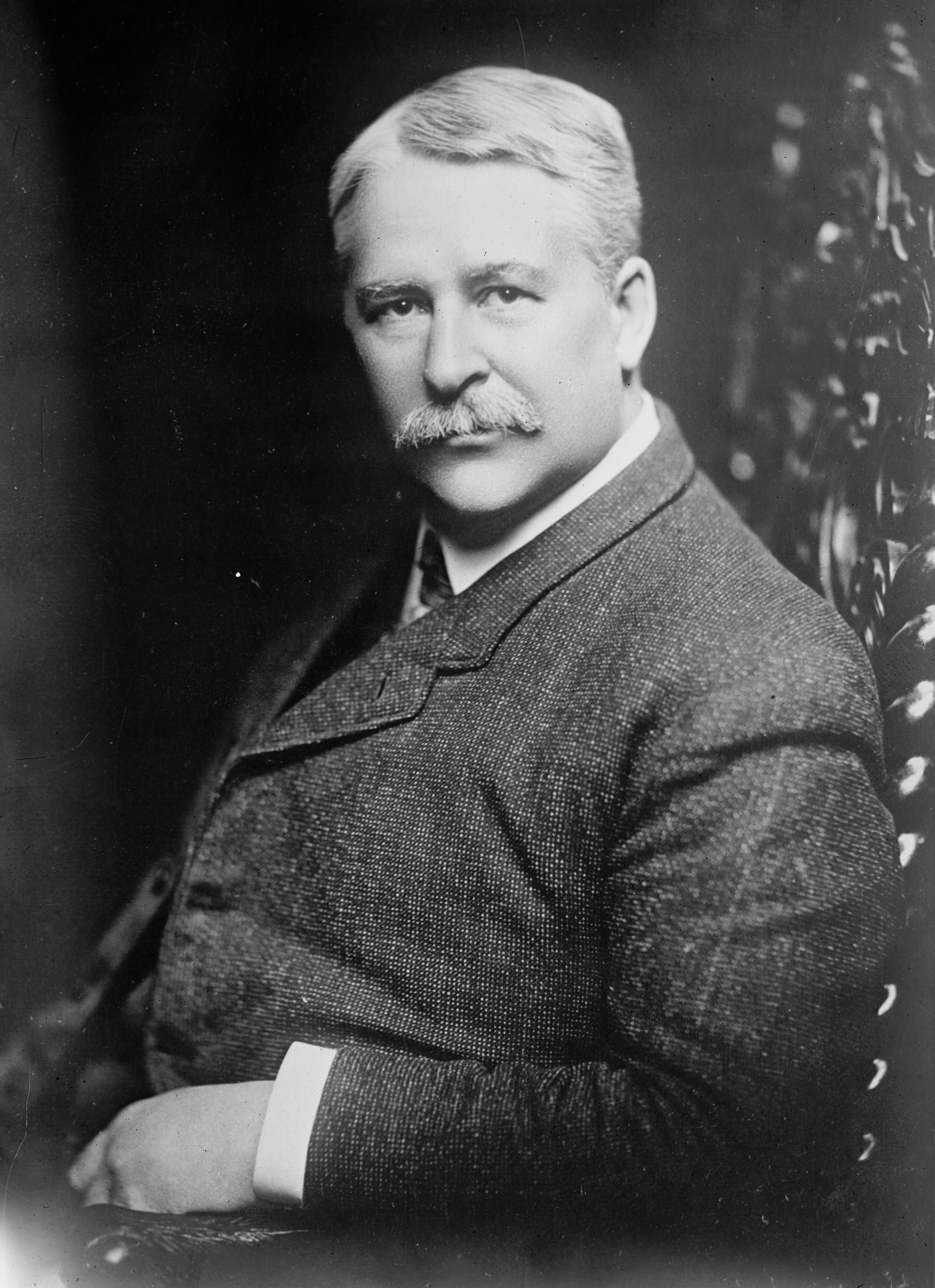
- Stillman in 1909
- Born: September 9, 1856; Normansville, New York
- Died: March 15, 1924 (aged 67); Albany, New York
- Occupations: Physician, writer

William Olin Stillman (September 9, 1856 – March 15, 1924) was an American physician, animal welfare activist, humanitarian and medical writer.

== Biography ==
Stillman was born in Normansville, New York. He graduated from Albany Medical College with his M.D. degree in 1878 and worked as a physician at a sanitarium in Saratoga Springs (1878–1883). He obtained a Master of Arts from Union College in 1880.

Stillman married Frances M. Rice on April 18, 1880. From 1883 to 1884, he studied at the universities in Berlin, Vienna and Paris and the hospitals in London. Returning to Albany, Stillman lectured on the history of medicine at Albany Medical School and wrote many medical publications. He was physician to the Open Door Mission and Hospital for Incurables (1887–1888) and to the Dominican Monastery and the Home For Christian Workers.

Stillman supported the humane treatment of animals and children and was president of the American Humane Association for 20 years. He was president of the Mohawk & Hudson River Humane Society for 36 years. He was chairman of the New York State Humane Education Committee and president of the International Federation of Societies for Animal Protection. Stillman established the Be Kind to Animals Week in 1915.

Stillman died at his home in Albany on March 15, 1924.

== Award ==
The American Humane Association offers the William O. Stillman award to animals who in the face of danger have saved human lives or vice versa. The award is given "for recognition of a humane act of rescuing animals at personal risk or of the rescue by an animal of human life by virtue of extreme intelligence in an emergency. To an individual or to an animal."

== Selected publications ==
- The Future of the New York State Historical Association (1912)
- The Prevention of Cruelty to Animals (1912)
