= Kosta Browne =

Winery in California

- Location: Sebastopol, California
- Coordinates: 38.4932° N 122.8212 °W
- Founded: 1997
- Key people: Dan Kosta, co-founder Michael Browne, co-founder
- Parent company: Duckhorn Wine Company
- Known for: Sonoma Coast Pinot Noir
- Varietals: Pinot Noir, Chardonnay
- Tasting: By Appointment Only
- Website: kostabrowne.com

Kosta Browne is a winery in Sebastopol, California, specializing in Pinot Noir. Kosta Browne was founded in 1997 and is currently owned by Duckhorn Wine Company.

== History and production ==
In 1997, Dan Kosta and Michael Browne founded Kosta Browne Winery. Their 2009 Sonoma Coast Pinor Noir won Wine Spectator's Wine of the Year Award in 2011. The winery relied on purchased grapes until 2013, when they bought a 20-acre vineyard, followed by a 60-acre purchase in Anderson Valley 2016.

Kosta Browne was known for highly extracted wines made from very sugar-rich, ripe grapes, starting with the 2002 and 2003 vintages. Since 2015 the winery has changed its style towards less extraction.

The winery has been sold twice to private-equity firms; in 2015, to J.W. Childs Associates; and in 2018, to the Duckhorn Wine Company, which is owned by TSG Consumer Partners.
