= The Happy Egg Company =

American egg producer headquartered in Arkansas

- Type: Private
- Industry: Poultry
- Founded: 2012
- Headquarters: Rogers, Arkansas, United States
- Area served: United States
- Website: happyegg.com

The Happy Egg Company is an American egg producer headquartered in Rogers, Arkansas. It is the first commercial egg producer in the U.S. to be certified by the American Humane Association.

== History ==
Happy Egg began in the UK in 2009 as a brand belonging to Noble Foods. It entered the United States in 2012 and reported sales of one million eggs by 2014. The Happy Egg Company relocated its headquarters from San Francisco to Rogers in 2018. In March 2019, it separated from the Noble Foods–owned UK brand and became independent.

== Operations ==
The Happy Egg Company contracts with family farms in the American South and Midwest for its products. The company has been a philanthropic supporter of the Northwest Arkansas Children's Shelter and is the only Whole30-approved egg brand. The Happy Egg Company's eggs are Certified Free Range by the American Humane Association (AHA) and its hens have access to more than eight acres of pasture. It is the first commercial egg producer in the U.S. to be certified by the AHA.

The Organic Consumers Association has argued that Happy Egg's use of the term "pasture raised" is deceptive and that the company's treatment of hens does not actually meet these standards. OCA filed a legal claim to this effect in 2020.

== Products ==
As of 2020, The Happy Egg Company marketed three products: Organic Free Range, Free Range, and Free Range Blue & Brown Heritage Breed.

== See also ==
- Sustainable agriculture
