= Butterfly Equity =

American private equity company

Butterfly Equity LP
- Founded: 2016
- Headquarters: Beverly Hills, California
- Key people: Adam Waglay (CEO)
- AUM: US$4 billion (2022)
- Subsidiaries: Chosen Foods; Qdoba; Bolthouse Farms
- Website: bfly.com

Butterfly Equity LP is an American private equity company based in Beverly Hills, California.

== History ==
Butterfly Equity LP was founded in 2016 by Dustin Beck and Adam Waglay. The company operates out of Beverly Hills, California and specializes in pecializes in food investments, and is the owner of Qdoba, Bolthouse Farms, and Chosen Foods.

In 2026, Adam Waglay assumed full operational control over the company as CEO. The same year, the company was named in a class action lawsuit regarding a salmonella outbreak at their subsidiary restaurant company, Qdoba.

=== Investments ===
In 2021, Butterfly invested in MaryRuth Ghiyam's MaryRuth Organics, LLC, a health and wellness brand operating in the premium vitamins, minerals, and supplements.

Generous Brands, a portfolio company of Butterfly, acquired Health-Ade kombucha in 2025. Butterfly reportedly acquired the kombucha brand for $500 million from fellow private-equity investors First Bev and Manna Tree Partners.
