= EMS =

EMS, ems, Ems, or EMs may refer to:

== Places and rivers ==
- Domat/Ems, a Swiss municipality in the canton of Grisons
- Ems (river) (Eems), a river in northwestern Germany and northeastern Netherlands that discharges in the Dollart Bay
- Ems (Eder), a river of Hesse, Germany, a tributary of the Eder
- River Ems (Chichester Harbour), an English river with its mouth at Emsworth, Hampshire
- Bad Ems, a German town in Rhineland-Palatinate, until 1913 named Ems

== Businesses ==
- Eastern Mountain Sports, an outdoor retailer
- Eitzen Maritime Services, a Norwegian company
- Electronic Music Studios, a manufacturer of synthesizers
- Elektromreža Srbije, a Serbian electric utility company
- Event Marketing Solutions, a UK-based provider of vehicle-based marketing roadshows
- Ems-Chemie, Swiss chemical company
- EMS (pharmaceuticals), a Brazilian pharmaceutical company
- EMS Recordings, a 1949–1952 American experimental-music record label
- EMS Technologies, an American company
- Elephant Memory Systems, a computer floppy disk manufacturer

== Organizations ==
- Edinburgh Mathematical Society
- Environmental Media Services, an American nonprofit organization
- Estonian Mathematical Society
- European Monetary System, a former European monetary cooperation
- European Mathematical Society
- European Meteorological Society

== Schools ==
=== United States ===
- Eagleview Middle School, El Paso County, Colorado
- Eastern Middle School, Montgomery County, Maryland
- Elwood Middle School, New York
- Penn State College of Earth and Mineral Sciences (commonly referred to as EMS), part of Penn State University, University Park, Pennsylvania
- Eastern Mennonite School, Harrisonburg, Virginia
- Eastern Mennonite Seminary, Harrisonburg, Virginia

=== Elsewhere ===
- Earl Marriott Secondary School, Surrey, British Columbia, Canada
- English Martyrs School and Sixth Form College, Hartlepool, County Durham, England
- Exeter Mathematics School, Exeter, Devon, England
- EM Strasbourg Business School, Strasbourg, France

== Science and technology ==
=== Physics, chemistry, and biology ===
- Electromagnetic suspension, a method to suspend an object
- Electromagnetic spectrum, is the range of all possible electromagnetic radiation
- Ethyl methanesulfonate (or methanesulfonic acid ethyl ester), a mutagen
- European macroseismic scale, a scale used when measuring earthquakes intensity
- Environmental Mutagen Society

=== Computer and engineering ===
- Electronics manufacturing services, a type of company
- Electronic meeting system, a collaborative computer software
- Element management system, software to monitor and control network elements (devices) in telecommunications
- Emergency Management Services, a part of MS-Windows
- Energy management software, software to monitor and optimize energy consumption in buildings or communities
- Energy management system (electrical grid), a system to control, monitor, and optimize the generation and flow of Electric Power
- Engine management system, see engine control unit
- Enhanced Messaging Service, an extension to Short Message Service (SMS) for mobile phone
- Expanded Memory Specification, a memory specification for x86 PCs supported by DOS etc.
- Enterprise messaging system, a middleware system for sending messages between two or more clients
- Execution management system, a trading system with a user interface for market data, indicators and order entry

=== Medical and veterinary ===
- Emergency medicine, a medical specialty concerned with care for patients who require immediate medical attention
  - Emergency medical services, a service providing out-of-hospital acute care and transport
  - Emergency Hospital Service, also known as the Emergency Medical Service, which provided centralized state-run medical care in World War II Britain
- Eosinophilia–myalgia syndrome, a neurological conditioner
- Electrical muscle stimulation, a type of medical therapy, also referred to as Electro Myo-Stimulation, a technique used in sports training and rehabilitation
- Equine metabolic syndrome, a horse disease

=== Other science and technology ===
- Earthen manure storage, structures for the storage of liquid livestock manure
- Environmental management system, part of a management system of an organization similar to a quality management system
- Engine monitoring system, data logging, display and alerting device, a simpler form of an aircraft engine-indicating and crew-alerting system
- Expected mean squares, in statistics

== Other uses ==
- HMS Ems (1809), a Royal Navy vessel captured from the Dutch in 1809
- Ems (ship), an 1893 British iron sailing ship
- A US Navy hull classification symbol: Expeditionary medical ship (EMS)
- Express Mail Service, an international express postal service offered by members of the Universal Postal Union
- Experimental Music Studios, a computer music center at the University of Illinois
- E. M. S. Namboodiripad (1909–1998), an Indian communist leader
- Alutiiq language, an ISO 639-3 code

== See also ==
- Ems Dispatch, a historical document
- EM (disambiguation)
