= Liquid manure spreader =

Agricultural machine

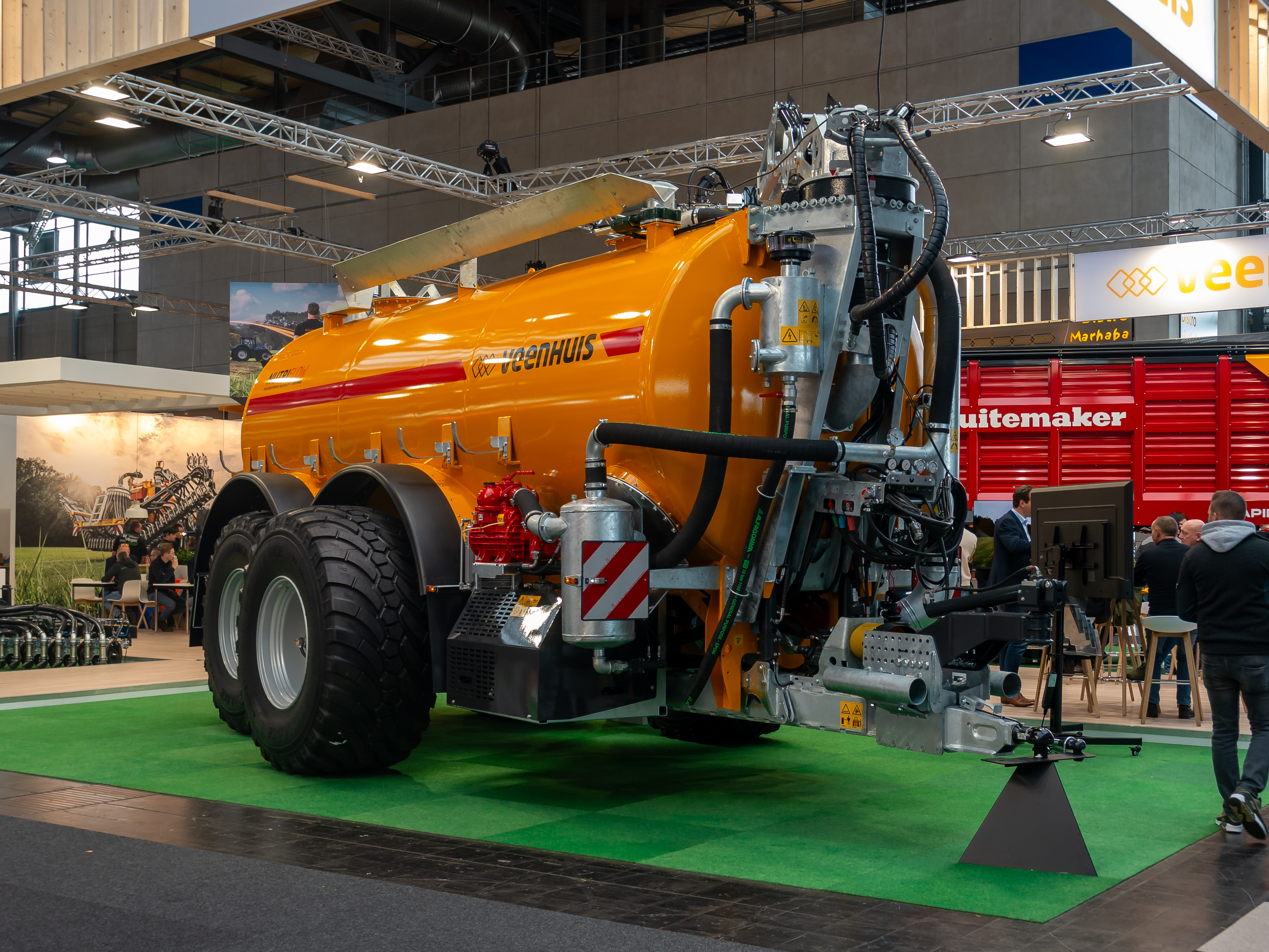
Liquid manure spreader with extendable wheels designed to reduce soil compaction

A liquid manure spreader, also called a slurry spreader, is a piece of agricultural equipment designed to transport liquid manure (slurry or digestate) from storage and distribute it over fields. Equipped with a spreading tool at the rear, this implement enables the fertilization of arable land or grassland using slurry.

Liquid manure, sourced from slurry pits of livestock farms or biogas plants, is typically applied in the spring to fertilize arable land, fallow fields, or fields with catch crops. In the fall, after fields have been harvested, they are often re-fertilized using a liquid manure spreader, followed by the sowing of green manure crops. Additionally, manure spreaders are frequently used between grassland mowings to maintain soil fertility.

Farmers, particularly livestock farmers, often own a liquid manure tank because it is cost-effective due to its year-round use. However, contractors are commonly hired to expedite fertilization over large areas. To optimize efficiency, contractors often use tank trailers to transport the slurry from the manure pit to the field, allowing the liquid manure spreader to remain on-site for continuous fertilization. For even greater efficiency, a large-capacity manure container can be placed at the edge of the field. This container acts as a buffer, facilitating seamless transfer between the transport trailer and the spreader.

Agricultural machinery is generally available in three formats: self-propelled, towed, or carried. Self-propelled machinery features its own engine for propulsion, while towed or carried equipment requires a tractor for movement. Liquid manure spreaders are typically available in self-propelled or towed versions, although umbilical slurry spreaders can be considered a carried type of liquid manure spreader.

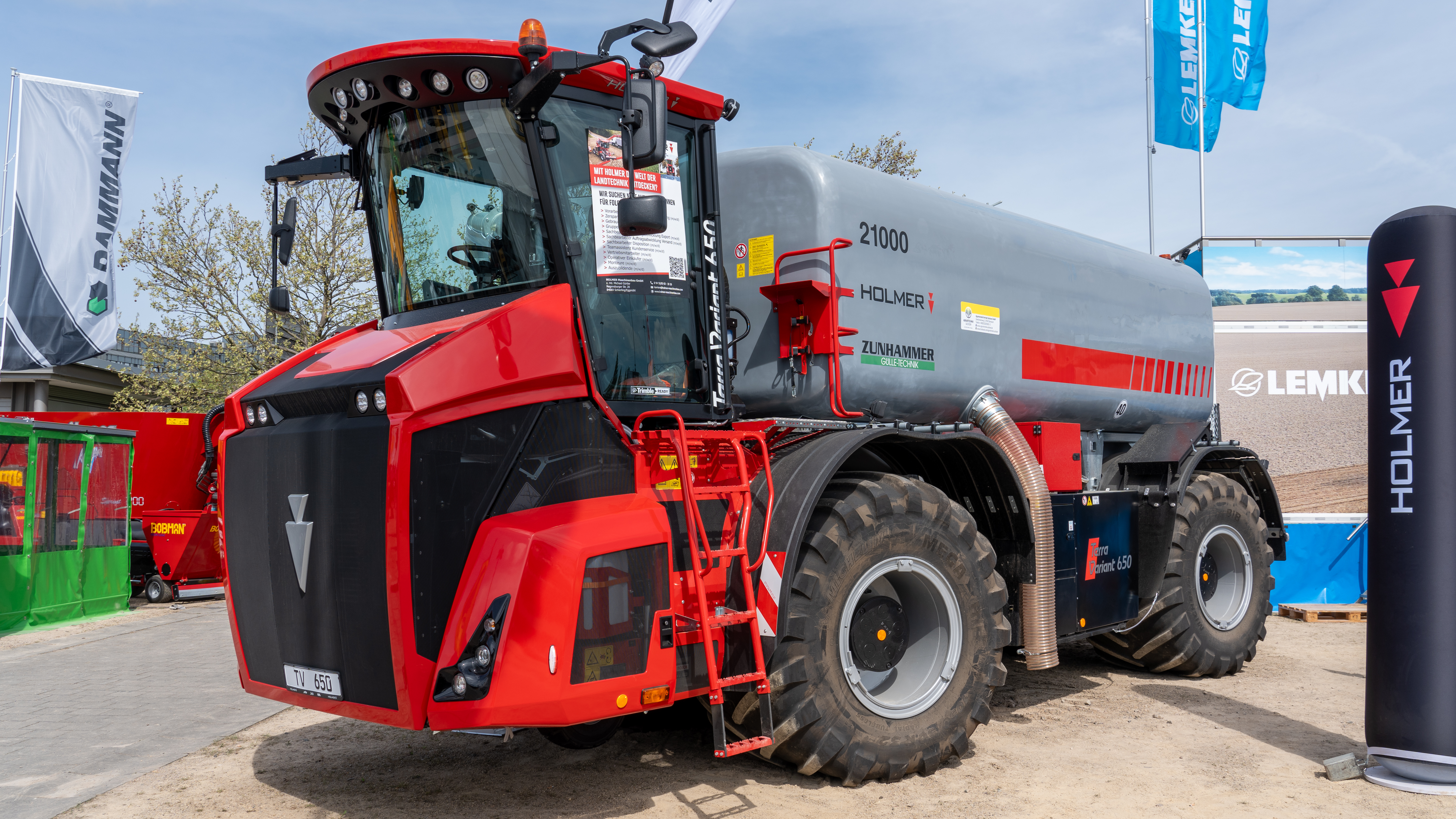
Self-propelled liquid manure spreader

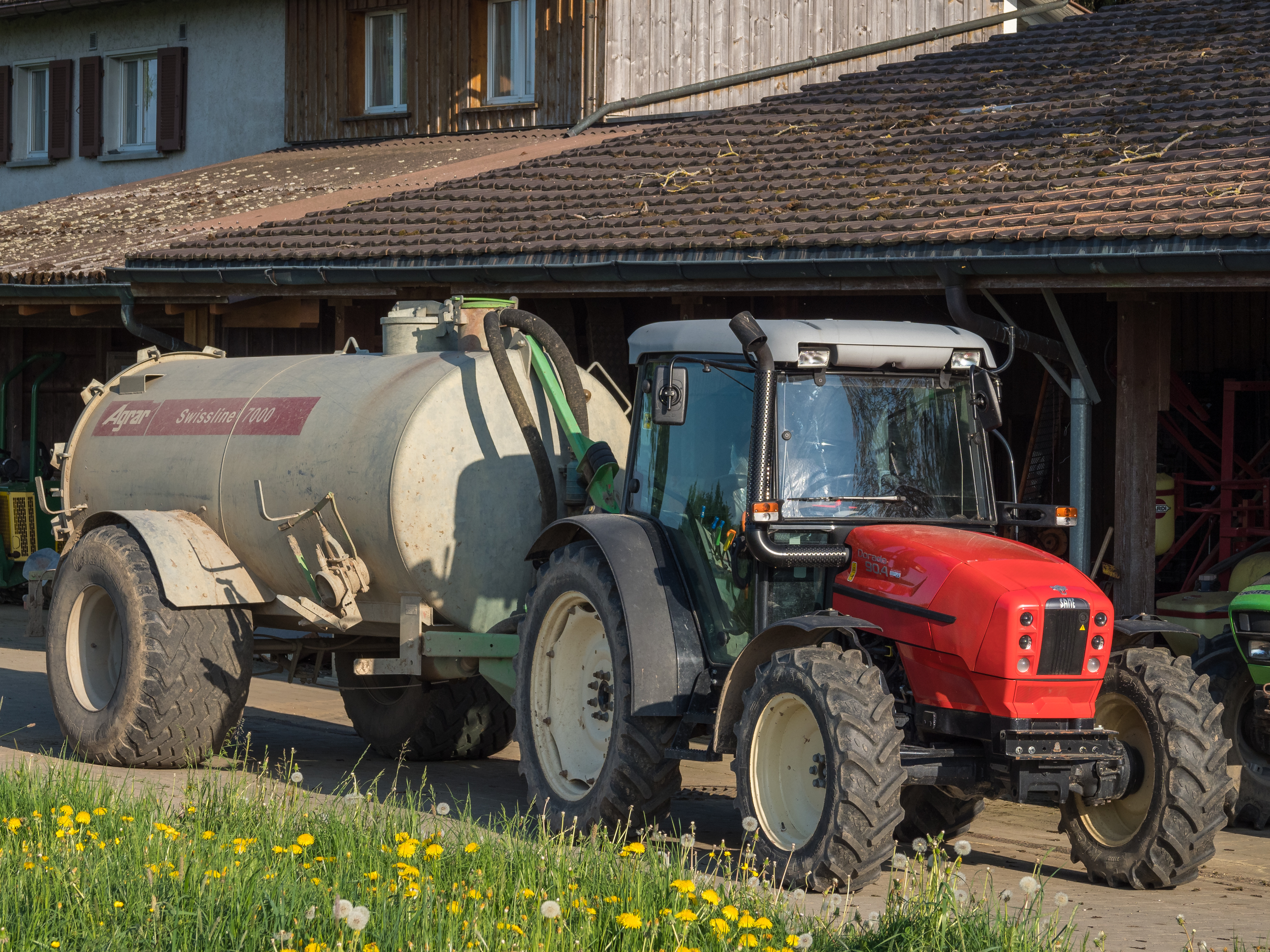
Towed liquid manure spreader

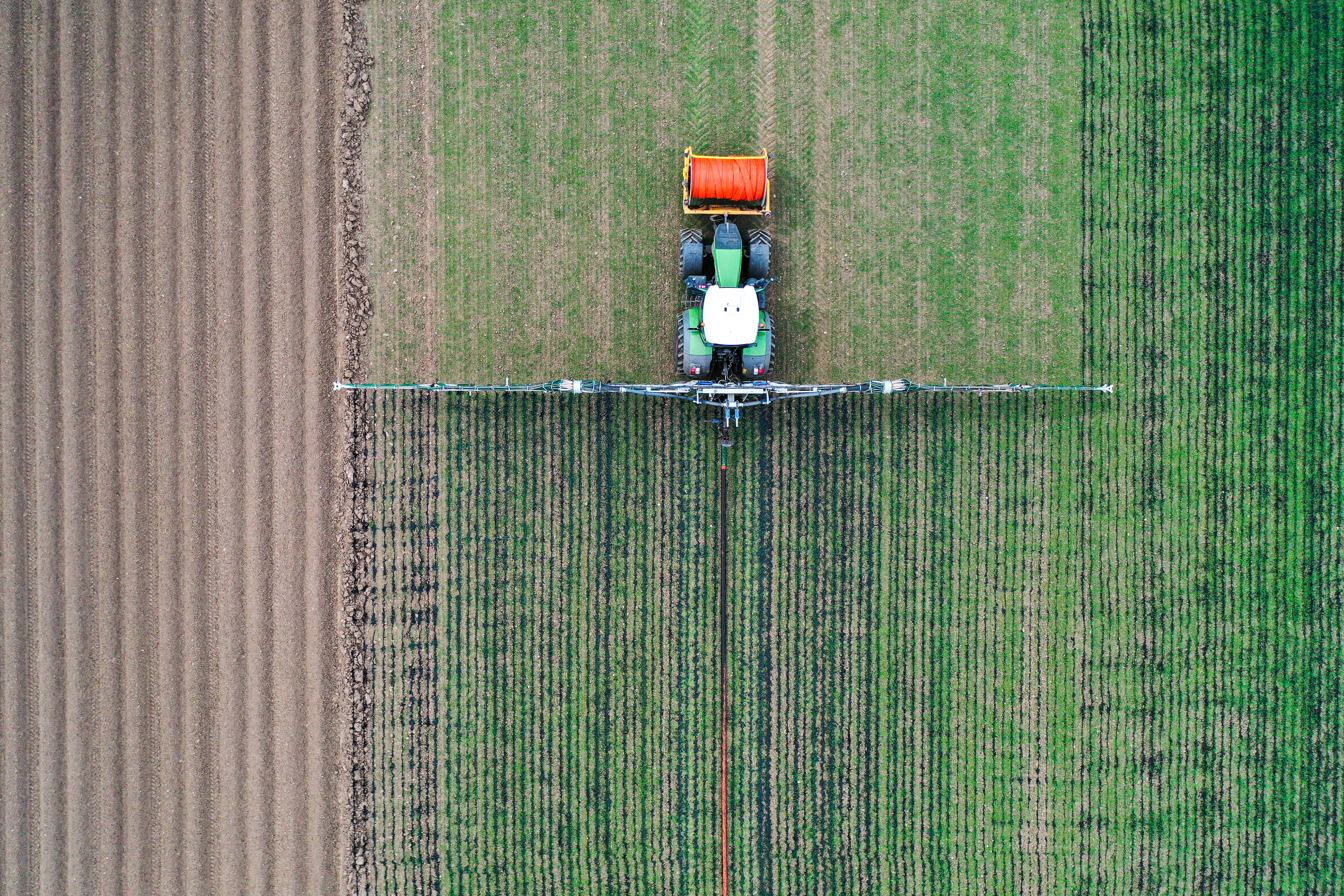
Carried liquid manure spreader; umbilical slurry spreader
