= Cafe24 =

South Korean e-commerce platform company

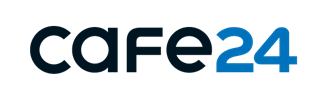
- Native name: 카페24
- Type: Public
- Traded as: KRX: 042000
- Industry: Electronic commerce
- Founded: May 17, 1999
- Founder: Lee Jae-seok
- Headquarters: 15, Boramae-ro 5-gil, Dongjak-gu, Seoul, South Korea
- Key people: Lee Jae-seok (CEO)
- Services: E-commerce platform, web hosting, marketing solutions
- Revenue: ₩314,764 (2025)
- Operating income: ₩40,227 (2025)
- Net income: ₩39,063 (2025)
- Total assets: ₩415,570 (2025)
- Number of employees: 982 (2025)
- Website: www.cafe24corp.com/en

Cafe24 (Korean: 카페24) is a South Korean global e-commerce platform company that provides infrastructure for building, operating, and marketing online stores on a one-stop basis. As of 2025, the company recorded an annual gross merchandise value (GMV) of approximately KRW 13.6 trillion and operates approximately 2 million cumulative store brands. The company is listed on the KOSDAQ market under ticker code 042000.

- Open API: over 400
- Design templates: approximately 300,000
- Partner companies: approximately 67,000
- App market GMV (2025): KRW 75.4 billion (YoY +64.21%)

== History ==
Year	Key Events
1999	Founded as Simplex Internet Co., Ltd. Internet hosting service launched.
2000	Cafe24 brand officially launched.
2002	'Cafe24 Hosting Center' opened.
2003	Entered the e-commerce solution market. 'Shopping Mall Center' opened.
2008	Established subsidiary in China (Yanji). Started overseas expansion.
2011	Cafe24 Startup Center opened.
2012	Established subsidiary in Japan (Tokyo).
2017	Company name changed from 'Simplex Internet Co., Ltd.' to 'Cafe24 Corp.' Won the Prime Minister's Award at the Korea Startup Awards.
2018	Listed on KOSDAQ. App Store service launched.
2020	Facebook and Instagram Shops integration service launched. First among Korean companies.
2021	Strategic partnership with Naver through mutual share exchange worth KRW 130 billion.
2022	YouTube Shopping integration service launched. TikTok for Business commerce partnership established.
2023	Secured KRW 26 billion investment from Google. Enterprise service launched.
2024	World's first YouTube Shopping dedicated store feature launched. Upgraded to integrated D2C service in April 2026.
2025	Cafe24 PRO service officially launched. Monthly GMV grew 14.6x within one year of launch. Cafe24 Community Center opened.
2026	YouTube Shopping service upgraded to integrated D2C service.

== Services ==
=== Shopping Mall Solution ===
A platform that allows anyone to create and operate an online store for free. As of 2025, approximately 2 million brands ranging from individual entrepreneurs to small and medium-sized enterprises use the platform. It supports the entire process of online business, from store construction to payment, delivery, inventory, and order management, as well as domestic and international open market integration, SNS channel integration, and global sales. Domestic and global stores can be managed from a single admin panel with multilingual and multi-currency settings.

=== Cafe24 PRO ===
A premium service that manages the entire store operation process on behalf of the merchant. It handles everything from product registration, production, SEO, and CRM to integrated market management and global sales, including branding and GEO (AI search exposure optimization). Officially launched in 2025, monthly GMV grew 14.6 times within one year of launch.

- Commerce solution: One-click shopping mall creation, channel expansion, and integrated management
- Supply chain service: Product sourcing, logistics, delivery, and dropshipping
- Marketing solution: Data-driven targeting, performance analysis, and expert consulting
- SEO and GEO (AI search exposure optimization) support

=== YouTube Shopping ===
A shopping integration service co-developed with Google and YouTube. In April 2026, it was upgraded from a YouTube-exclusive structure to an integrated D2C service that can attract customers from various channels including SNS and marketing content. It provides a content commerce experience where purchases can be made directly from live and video content.

=== Enterprise ===
A customized service that supports the construction of D2C online stores optimized for the business structure of mid-to-large enterprises. It provides AI-based personalization, legacy system integration, and 1:1 dedicated manager coaching.

=== K-Manufacturing Brand ===
A service that supports D2C commerce innovation for domestic manufacturing companies. It supports the entire process of global D2C sales, from supply chain construction to multilingual store setup, local payment and delivery integration, and overseas marketing. The project recorded a 36% service adoption conversion rate within two months of launch.

== Marketing Solutions ==
Cafe24 provides integrated marketing solutions based on data from 2 million stores and AI technology. A group of 250 experts presents strategies tailored to target countries, and manages the entire advertising process including program selection, production, media selection, budget allocation, and performance management.

- Performance-based advertising: A performance-linked advertising service where fees are settled after sales are generated without upfront costs.
- Channel integration: Integrated connection to domestic open markets (Naver Smart Store, Coupang, 11Street), global markets (Amazon, eBay, Rakuten, Lazada, Shopee), and SNS shopping (YouTube, Instagram, Facebook, TikTok).
- Global advertising network: Localized integrated marketing through official advertising agencies of major media in each country including Google, Meta, Naver, Baidu, and LINE.

== Global Business ==
Cafe24 operates in over 200 countries worldwide, and offers automated translations for international customers.

- Payment: Automatic processing of local payment methods including PayPal, Eximbay, Alipay, and Stripe.
- Delivery: Automatic integration with global delivery services including EMS, FedEx, Hanjin, and CJ Logistics.
- Localization: Creation and management of multilingual stores in English, Chinese, Japanese, Vietnamese, and more.

== Store Ecosystem ==
=== App Store ===
An app market where external developers and partners can expand shopping mall functionality. Launched in July 2018, as of 2025 it recorded total app market GMV of KRW 75.4 billion (YoY +64.21%), over 440 essential apps by category, and cumulative app downloads of 265,282.

=== Developer Center ===
An open development platform where external developers and individual developers can develop and launch apps that integrate with Cafe24 stores. It provides development guides, open APIs, SDKs, and technical support on a one-stop basis, and developed apps can be launched directly through the Cafe24 Store.

- Open API: over 400 (industry-leading level)

=== Design Center ===
A design marketplace where shopping mall design templates and sources can be traded.

=== Expert ===
An expert matching platform that connects professionals in design, marketing, and development with shopping mall operators.

== Technology and Infrastructure ==
Cafe24 operates over 30,000 servers and has the industry's largest 460G backbone network. Over 400 professional technical staff manage servers 24 hours a day, 365 days a year. Web hosting, server hosting, colocation, and other Internet hosting services are provided, supporting both Linux and Windows server environments.

=== AI Website Builder ===
In May 2026, Cafe24 launched AI Website Builder, a no-code, generative AI website creation and business-management platform aimed at small and medium-sized businesses (SMBs). Unlike general-purpose website builders such as Wix and Squarespace, or developer-oriented deployment platforms such as Vercel and Netlify, the service combines website generation with an integrated suite of operations tools including online payments, reservation and booking management, customer messaging, and a visitor analytics dashboard.

The product provides industry-specific templates for six sectors—healthcare, education, hospitality and leisure, professional services, religious organizations, and business-to-business services—and uses a natural-language editor that converts plain-language instructions into page layouts and styling. It is offered on a single subscription plan with a one-month free trial, with domain registration, [[web hosting]], and an SSL certificate included.

The launch followed an internal analysis by Cafe24 of 551 in-person consultations held at its PRO Community Center in Seoul between January and May 2026, which the company said indicated that

the main obstacle for prospective online sellers was execution rather than a lack of information. Cafe24 chief executive Lee Jae-suk said,

There is a lot of information about online business, but in the actual start-up process there is still strong demand for support that allows people to review and execute together with experts.

AI Website Builder is part of a broader artificial-intelligence portfolio at Cafe24 that also includes AI SPACE, a platform as a service supporting the Model Context Protocol, and Cafe24 PRO, a direct-to-consumer service.

=== See also ===
- Website builder
- Vercel
- Wix.com
- Squarespace
- Shopify
- No-code development platform

=== AI SPACE ===
A platform as a service (PaaS) launched in April 2026. It is a hosting service that allows code written with AI code generation tools such as ChatGPT, Claude, and Cursor to be deployed in 10–30 seconds without server configuration. It operates based on the Model Context Protocol (MCP) open standard, enabling server creation, domain connection, SSL certificate issuance, and log analysis through conversation with AI tools. A key feature is that it is not dependent on any specific AI tool. It was developed to bridge the gap where AI-based code generation has become widespread through vibe coding, but technical barriers such as server configuration still exist in the actual deployment stage.

=== OpenClaw VPS ===
The first hosting service in South Korea to come pre-installed with the open-source AI agent framework 'OpenClaw'. AI agents can be built without coding. Launched in April 2026.

=== Hermes Agent VPS ===
A VPS hosting service dedicated to AI agents. It remembers conversations and automatically learns repetitive tasks, operating safely in a container isolation environment. Available from KRW 14,000 per month.

== Key Partnerships ==
=== Google / YouTube ===
In 2022, Cafe24 established an official YouTube Shopping integration partnership. In December 2023, it secured KRW 26 billion in investment from Google. In 2024, the world's first YouTube Shopping dedicated store was co-developed. Google Ads and Shopping direct integration is supported.

=== Naver ===
In August 2021, a strategic partnership was established through a mutual share exchange worth KRW 130 billion. Naver acquired a 13.69% stake in Cafe24, and Naver Smart Store and brand store integration was strengthened.

=== Meta (Facebook·Instagram) ===
In 2020, Facebook and Instagram Shops integration services were launched. It was the first D2C store integration model among Korean companies.

=== TikTok ===
In September 2022, a TikTok for Business commerce partnership was established and TikTok channel integration services were launched. It was the first service of its kind provided by a Korean company.

=== Global Open Markets, Payment, and Delivery ===
Global open market integration with Amazon, eBay, Rakuten, Lazada, Shopee, and Qoo10. Payment processing with PayPal, Alipay, Stripe, KCP, and KSNET. Automatic delivery integration with FedEx, EMS, Hanjin, and CJ Logistics.
