= Chicken manure =

Feces of chickens used as an organic fertilizer, especially for soil low in nitrogen

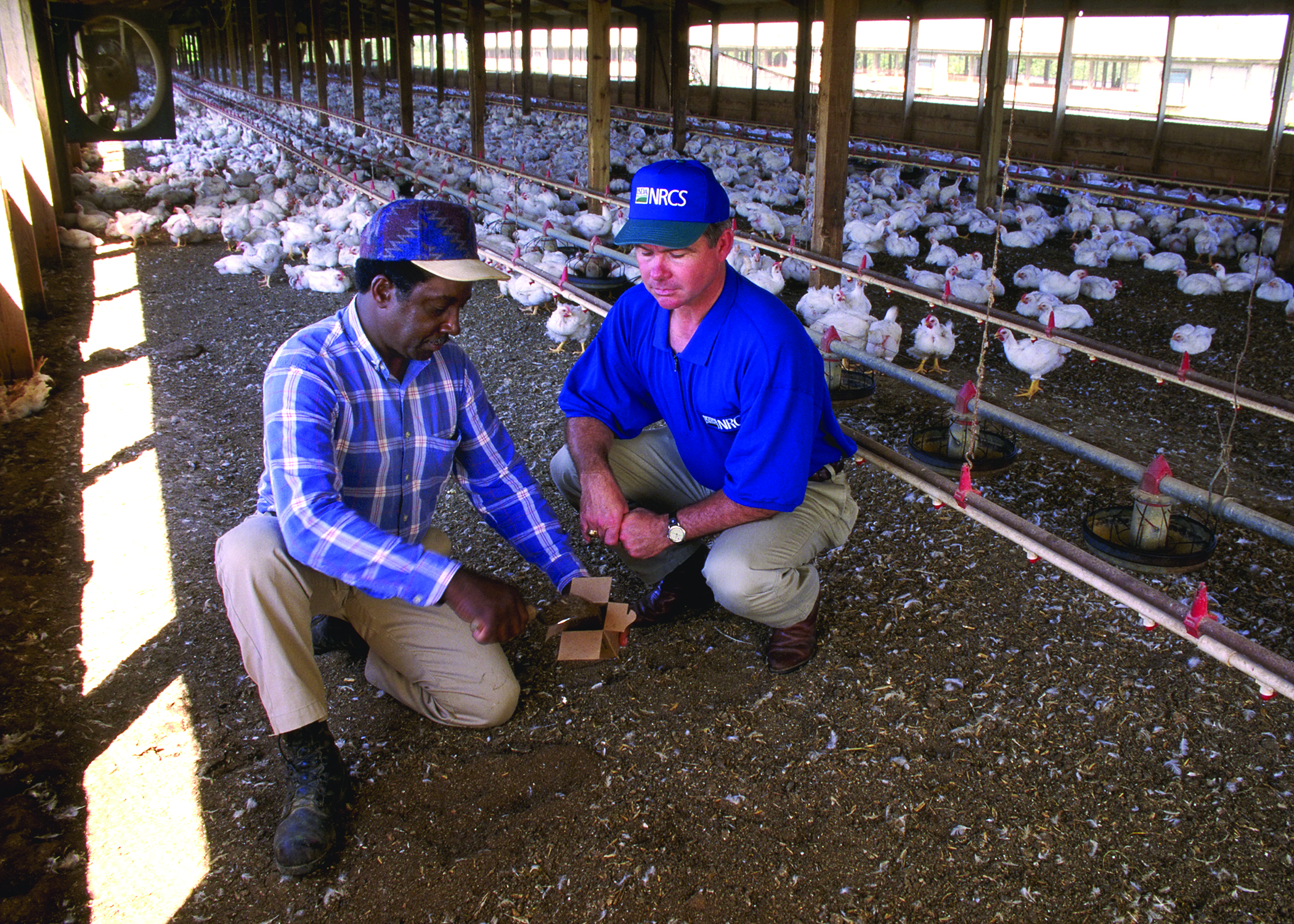
A chicken manure sample being collected for a nutrient analysis

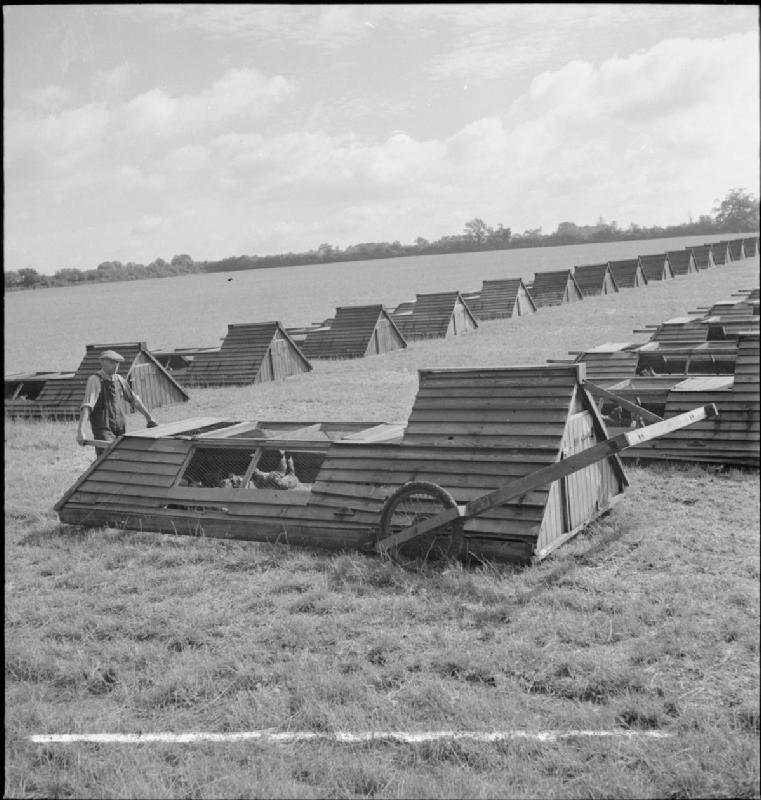
A poultryman in 1943 on a Hampshire County farm in England moves a poultry fold (chicken tractor) into line with the others in the field. Each of these chicken sheds contains 25 birds and are moved their length every day, providing fresh ground for the hens to feed on and also ensuring that the chicken manure is spread across the whole field.

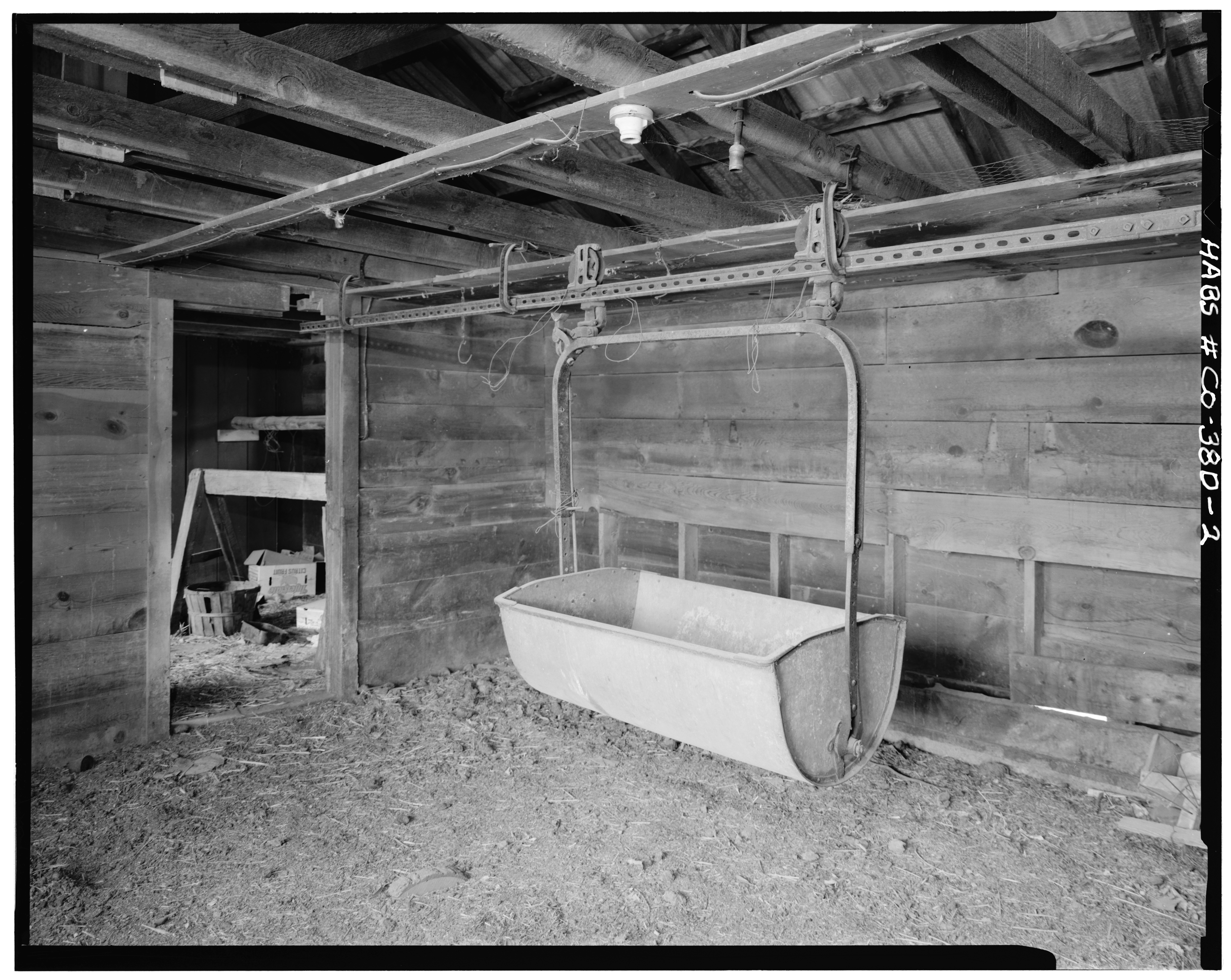
A manure car for the transport of chicken manure at a chicken house in Dolores, Colorado

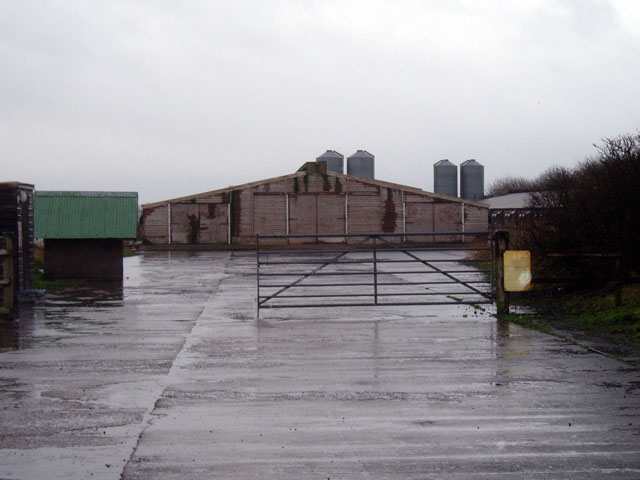
Chicken sheds at Balado Airfield, Scotland. Poultry sheds like this are common in the Kinross area of Scotland. Manure from the sheds is now collected for use as fuel in a biomass-burning power station at Westfield in Fife.

Chicken manure is the feces of chickens used as an organic fertilizer, especially for soil low in nitrogen. Of all animal manures, it has the highest amount of nitrogen, phosphorus, and potassium. Chicken manure is sometimes pelletized for use as a fertilizer, and this product may have additional phosphorus, potassium or nitrogen added. Optimal storage conditions for chicken manure include keeping it in a covered area and retaining its liquid, because a significant amount of nitrogen exists in the urine.

Fresh chicken manure contains 0.5% to 0.9% nitrogen, 0.4% to 0.5% phosphorus, and 1.2% to 1.7% potassium. One chicken produces approximately 8 to 11 pounds (3.6 to 5.0 kg) of manure monthly. Chicken manure can be used to create homemade plant fertilizer.

== Studies ==
In 1986, a master's thesis study in the Philippines compared the effects of using various fertilizers to enhance milkfish production in brackish water ponds. The study compared the use of using chicken manure only, cow manure only, 16-20-0 fertilizer only, a mixture of cow manure and 16-20-0 fertilizer, a mixture of chicken manure and 16-20-0 fertilizer, and a control group that used no fertilizer. The study concluded that the use of cow manure only as a fertilizer fared best, and the use of chicken manure only as a fertilizer fared second best.

== Pollution ==
Mass applications of chicken manure may create an unpleasant odor. In April 2014 in Escondido, California, a golf course that had "dumped" chicken manure on its grounds was cited by the county government after complaints from local residents about the odor.

In December 2011, the environmental group Environment Maryland asserted that water runoff from agricultural land fertilized with chicken manure was increasing the pollution levels of Chesapeake Bay. The group asserted that excessive phosphorus from the runoff was contributing to the increase of dead zones in the bay. In 2015, in efforts to address the matter before leaving office, Maryland Governor Martin O'Malley put a new regulation into use that "would have limited the amount of poultry manure that Eastern Shore farmers can use on their fields". However, the following Governor Larry Hogan quickly absolved the new regulation after being sworn into office. The runoff problem has been attributed to the use of "an outdated scientific tool for calculating the correct amount of manure". A proposed solution from scientists at the University of Maryland is to have farmers use a new (corrected) formula to calculate proper quantities of chicken manure for agricultural uses.

=== Human deterrent ===
Chicken manure has been used as a human deterrent. In July 2013, in Abbotsford, British Columbia, city workers applied chicken manure at a tent encampment to deter homeless people from the area. The affected homeless planned on initiating small claims lawsuits for loss of property and property damage. One of the affected homeless people described the tactics of city workers as "a chicken shit way to do things". The mayor of Abbotsford and the Fraser Valley city manager later apologized regarding the incident. Similar instances of using chicken manure in this manner have occurred in British Columbia in Surrey and in Port Coquitlam, the latter of which occurred "shortly after the Abbotsford incident".

== See also ==
- Chicken shit
- Guano
- Liquid manure
- Manure spreader
- Plant nutrition
- Labeling of fertilizer
