= Slurry pit =

Animal waste lagoon

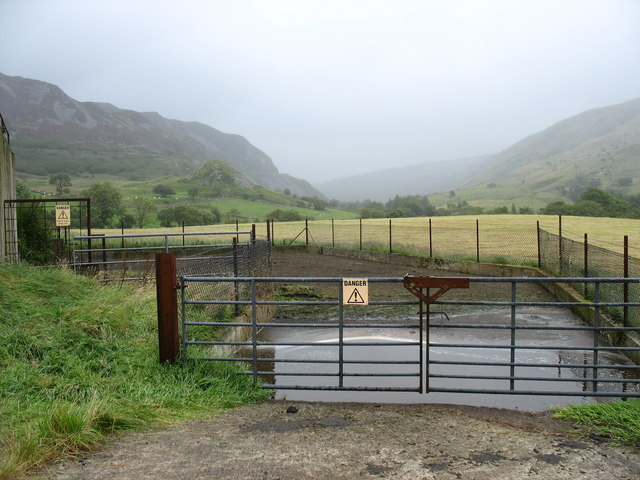
A fence-protected slurry pit.

A slurry pit, also known as a farm slurry pit, slurry tank, slurry lagoon or slurry store, is a hole, dam, or circular concrete structure where farmers gather all their animal waste together with other unusable organic matter, such as hay and water run off from washing down dairies, stables, and barns, in order to convert it over a lengthy period of time into fertilizer that can eventually be reused on their lands to fertilize crops. The decomposition of this waste material produces deadly gases, making slurry pits potentially lethal without precautions such as the use of a breathing apparatus with air supply.

== Nutrient value ==
The liquid manure blend, or slurry, can be a rich source of nitrogen, phosphorus, and potassium.

== Risks ==
Slurry pits present risks of drowning, as well as of suffocation. Decomposition generates gases such as ammonia, methane, carbon dioxide, and hydrogen sulphide. The latter two are heavier than air and will not disperse quickly from low places. Carbon dioxide is odorless, and hydrogen sulfide quickly becomes undetectable by odor by destroying victims' sense of smell. If inhaled, they can cause rapid unconsciousness by poisoning or displacement of oxygen leading to hypoxia. Death may follow then from poisoning or hypoxia directly, or by drowning caused by unconsciousness. The UK Health and Safety Executive also warns against the creation of naked flames near slurry pits, as gases such as methane are inherently flammable. The Health and Safety Executive of Northern Ireland specifies activity in a slurry pit as specialist work, requiring the worker to have a separate air supply and a harness lifeline managed by two additional people outside the tank. According to the Health and Safety Authority of Ireland, between 2000 and 2010, 30% of all child fatalities on farms occurred from drowning in slurry or water.

== See also ==
- Manure management
- Liquid manure silos at Wikimedia Commons
