= Barn cleaner =

A barn cleaner is a device used to aid in the cleaning of tie-stall and stanchion barns. It usually consists of a series of paddles chain linked together, that move manure and other waste through a gutter and into a manure spreader.
