= Chicken shit =

Slang term

Chicken shit or chickenshit
- Adjective
- Etymology: Compound of chicken and shit
- Meaning: "petty, insignificant" "lacking courage, manliness, or effectiveness"

Chicken shit, or more commonly chickenshit, is a slang term, usually regarded as vulgar. The online Merriam-Webster dictionary defines chickenshit (one word) as a vulgar adjective with two possible meanings: "petty, insignificant" or "lacking courage, manliness, or effectiveness".

== Coward ==
The term has been used figuratively since 1929 to allege cowardice. It can be used as either a noun or an adjective; it is always an insult. In October 2014, an unnamed senior official in the Obama administration was reported to have called Israeli prime minister Benjamin Netanyahu a "chickenshit", adding that he "has got no guts". Secretary of State John Kerry apologized to the prime minister, while Israeli media scrambled to understand or translate the idiom.

== Petty ==
The alternate meaning of "petty, insignificant nonsense" may be used as either a noun or an adjective. According to Paul Fussell in his book Wartime, chickenshit in this sense has military roots: "Chickenshit refers to behavior that makes military life worse than it need be: petty harassment of the weak by the strong; open scrimmage for power and authority and prestige; sadism thinly disguised as necessary discipline; a constant 'paying off of old scores'; and insistence on the letter rather than the spirit of the ordinances ... Chickenshit is so called—instead of horse—or bull—or elephant shit—because it is small-minded and ignoble and takes the trivial seriously."

== Other uses ==
The phrase "You can't make chicken salad out of chicken shit" is sometimes used as a variant of "you can't make a silk purse out of a sow's ear". The expression dates back to at least the 1920s, when "chicken feathers" was sometimes used as a euphemism for chicken shit.

Former American president Lyndon B. Johnson once said, "Boys, I may not know much but I do know the difference between chicken shit and chicken salad."

== See also ==
- Bullshit
- On Bullshit
- Chicken manure
- Shit
- Shit happens
