= Event Marketing Solutions =

Vehicle-based marketing roadshow provider

- Founded: 2000; 26 years ago
- Founders: Keith Austin, Iain Johnston
- Website: eventms.com

Event Marketing Solutions Ltd (EMS) is a provider of vehicle-based marketing roadshows. The business was founded in October 2000 by Keith Austin (Managing Director) and Iain Johnston (Chairman).

EMS manage client campaigns in the UK, Europe, the Middle East and the United States and to date they have operated roadshows in over 40 countries. Their roadshow marketing service helps brands to communicate campaign messages to Business to Business, Business to Consumer and Internal Communication audiences.

They works across a range of market sectors, including FMCG, retail, technology, financial services, consumer electronics, healthcare, charity/not-for-profit, manufacturing, logistics and sport.

== Healthcare ==
EMS own and operate a fleet of exhibition trailers. In 2009 the business extended their service into the healthcare sector having invested in a fleet of mobile medical units, they have provided mobile medical facilities for various National Health Service trusts including NHS City & Hackney, NHS South West Essex, NHS Wigan, NHS Oxfordshire. They have also worked with the British Heart Foundation.

They have assisted with MMR vaccination programmes for NHS City & Hackney and NHS South West Essex. They also assisted the Health Service in Wandsworth, South London, by providing temporary accommodation for GP services during the construction of a new permanent health centre
