= Earthen manure storage =

Structures used for the storage of livestock manure

Earthen manure storages are engineered structures used for the storage of liquid livestock manure. Generally these structures are designed so that about fifty percent of the structure is below existing grade and fifty percent is above. Certain circumstances such a high water table will require the structure to be built nearly all above grade. Conversely, it may be provident to build a deeper storage to accommodate gravity flow of the manure from a barn that is built at grade. Deeper EMSes still require some form of berming around them to prevent surface run-on.

== Designs ==
=== Cut and fill ===
If the in-situ soils are found to have sufficiently low permeability, generally in the order of 1E-9 m/s or less, a cut and fill style design is usually selected. This involves stripping the topsoil, excavating below grade the desired depth and building up berms in lifts of about 15 cm to the desired height, compacting between lifts. The "cut" area is generally scarified and compacted with a sheepsfoot packer.

=== Compacted clay lined ===
If in-situ soils are not of the quality needed for a "Cut and Fill" design, the next most desirable construction is that of a Compacted Clay Liner. Clay used for the liner may of lower quality than that found in-situ where a "Cut and Fill" EMS is built. However, it must be able to achieve a similar permeability when compacted to a specified Proctor Density. Clay may also be trucked in from a borrow pit. The liner will be at least 1 metre in thickness and installed in 15 cm lifts, compacting between lifts.

=== Synthetic lined ===
In areas where clay soils are not available or it is un-economic to transport it to the site, a synthetic or "poly" liner may be used. High density poly-ethylene (HDPE) is a common material used for this purpose. This type of liner is usually constructed from large sheets of HDPE welded together on site. Seams and joints must be tested for tear strength and a visual inspection for holes is done before the job is deemed complete. Synthetic liner are usually a last resort as they are significantly more expensive and can pose an environmental threat more readily if the liner is breached for any reason.

== Environmental impacts ==
Earthen manure storages are often cited as being environmental hazards by opponents of intensive livestock operations. Such claims generally stem from breaches and spills that have happened with older, poorly managed, EMSes. A properly managed EMS is usually much safer than an above ground concrete or steel manure storage which can suffer from catastrophic failure due to the large head pressure encountered. Below ground concrete storages also often suffer from cracking due to settlement. Earthen storages, provided they are not allowed to completely dry out, remain flexible throughout their lifespan, and do not suffer from cracking. Studies have been done on seepage rates from these storages that show they are safe and contaminants of concern do not travel into local aquifers.

== Occupational risks ==
Manure storage facilities carry several occupational health and safety risks for those who work in and around them. The major safety risk for workers is a lack of ventilation and toxic gases emitted from the manure, which can be lethal. Forced ventilation/positive pressure for 5-15 minutes is recommended to flush the toxic gases and replace them with oxygen so someone can enter the storage area safely.
