= Manure =

Organic matter, mostly derived from animal feces, which can be used as fertilizer

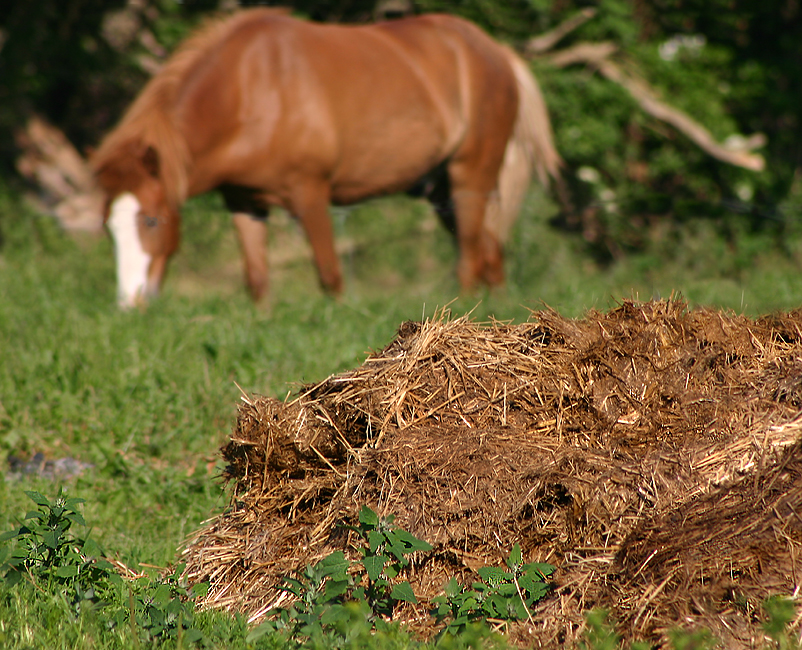
Animal manure is often a mixture of animal feces and bedding straw, as in this example from a stable.

Manure is organic matter that is used as organic fertilizer in agriculture. Most manure consists of animal feces; other sources include compost and green manure. Manures contribute to the fertility of soil by adding organic matter and nutrients, such as nitrogen, that are utilised by bacteria, fungi, and other organisms in the soil. Higher organisms then feed on the fungi and bacteria in a chain of life that comprises the soil food web.

== Types ==
Skatole is a component of the foul smelling odor of manure.

There are in the 21st century three main classes of manures used in soil management, as laid out below. The term artificial manure, formerly in wide use, referred to artificial fertilizers; the latter term is the one usually used today for such manures.

=== Animal manure ===
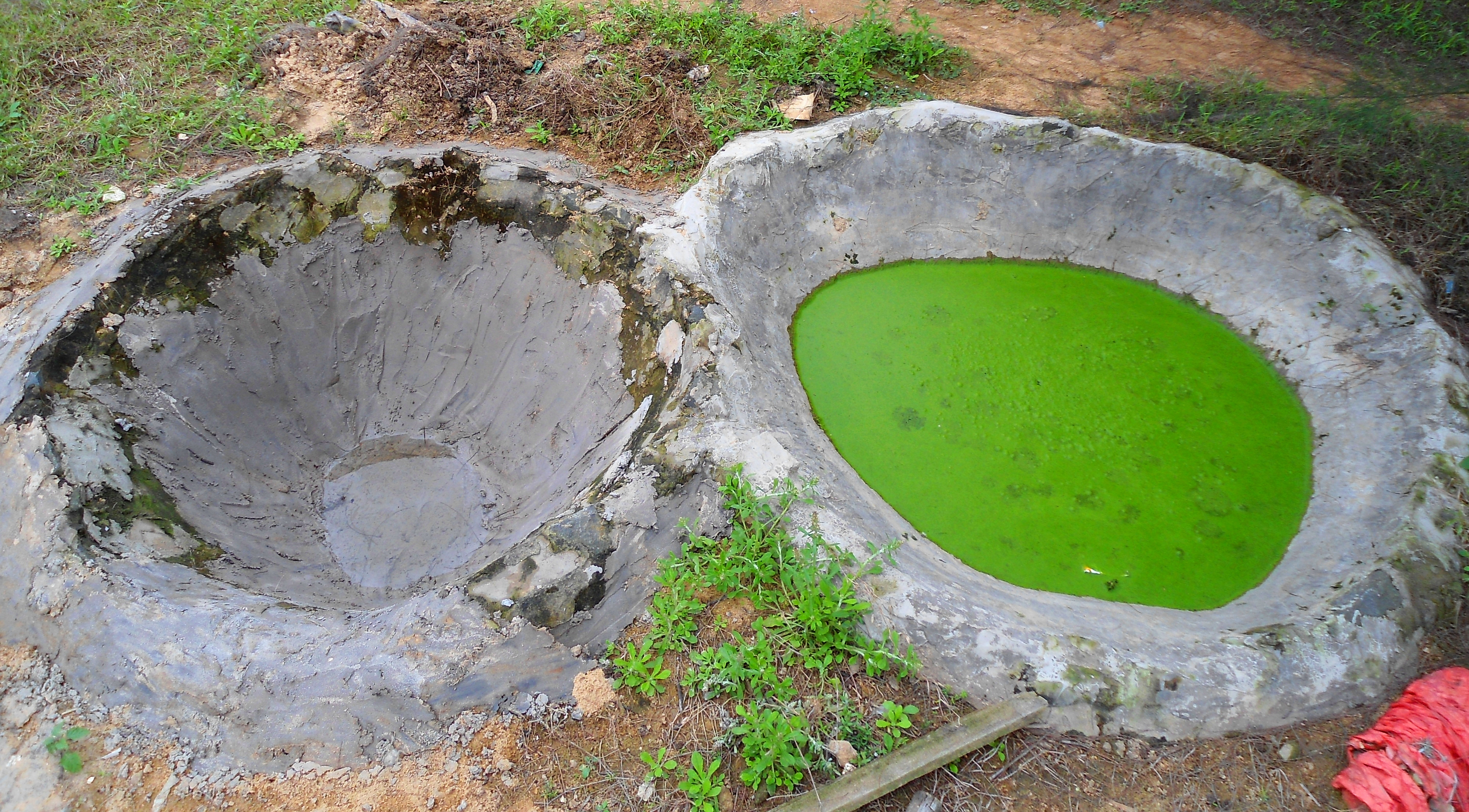
Concrete reservoirs, one new, and one containing cow manure mixed with water. This is common in rural Hainan Province, China.

Most animal manure consists of feces. Common forms of animal manure include farmyard manure (or farm slurry (liquid manure). Farmyard manure also contains plant material (often straw), which has been used as bedding for animals and has absorbed the feces and urine. Agricultural manure in liquid form, known as slurry, is produced by more intensive livestock rearing systems where concrete or slats are used instead of straw bedding. Manure from different animals such as horses, cattle, pigs, sheep, chickens, turkeys, rabbits, as well as guano from seabirds and bats, all have different properties and qualities and require different application rates when used as fertilizer. For instance, sheep manure is high in nitrogen and potash, while pig manure is relatively low in both. Horses mainly eat grass and a few weeds, so horse manure can contain grass and weed seeds, because horses do not digest seeds as cattle do. Cattle manure is a good source of nitrogen as well as organic carbon. Chicken litter, coming from a bird, is very concentrated in nitrogen and phosphate and is prized for both properties.

Animal manures may be adulterated or contaminated with other animal products, such as wool (shoddy and other hair), feathers, blood, and bone. Livestock feed can be mixed with the manure due to spillage. For example, chickens are often fed meat and bone meal, an animal product, which can end up becoming mixed with chicken litter.

=== Compost ===
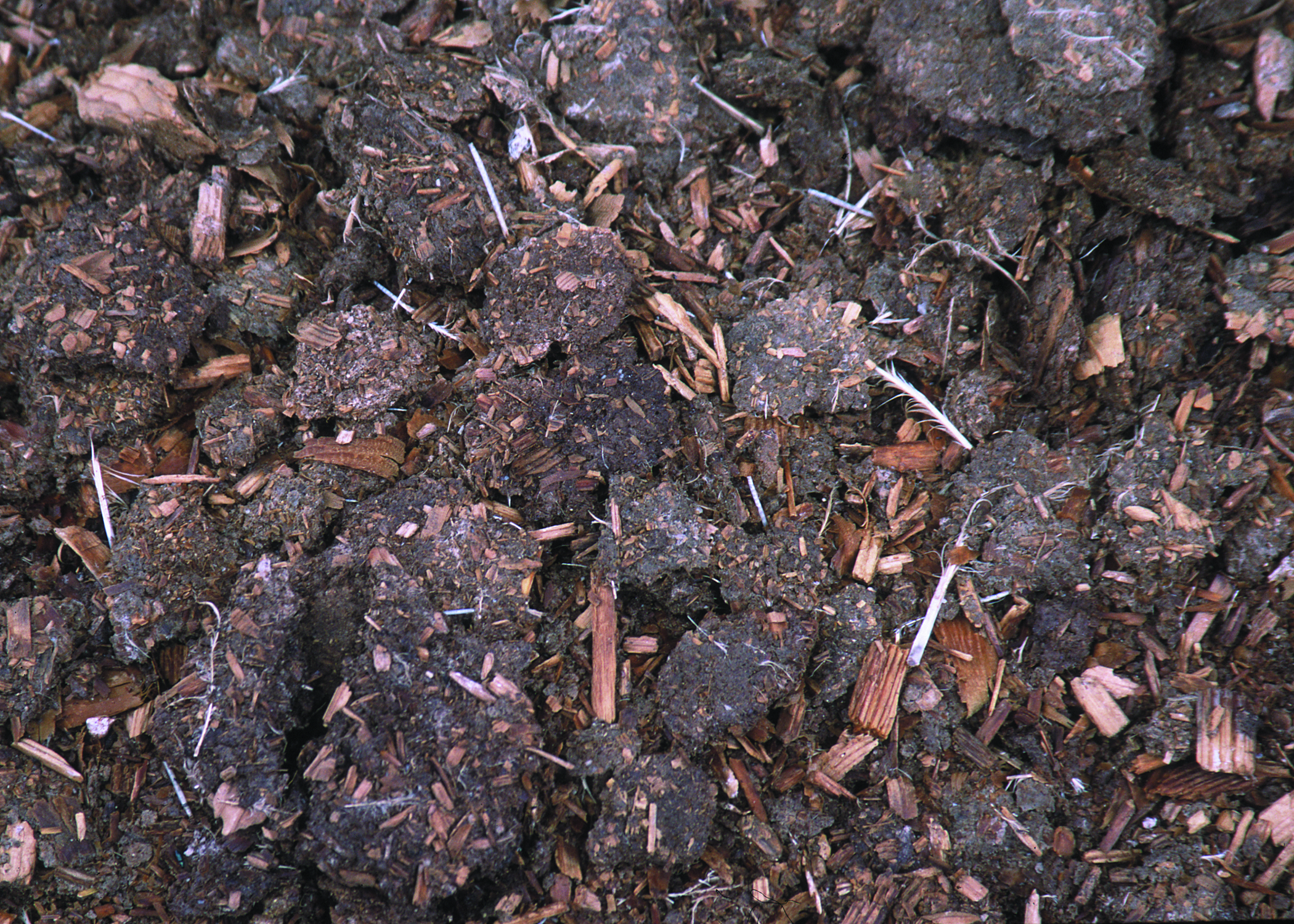
Compost containing turkey manure and wood chips from bedding material is dried and then applied to pastures for fertilizer.

Compost is the decomposed remnants of organic materials. It is usually of plant origin, but often includes some animal dung or bedding.

=== Green manure ===
Green manures are crops grown for the express purpose of plowing them in, thus increasing fertility through the incorporation of nutrients and organic matter into the soil. Leguminous plants such as clover are often used for this, as they fix nitrogen using Rhizobia bacteria in specialized nodes in the root structure.

Other types of plant matter used as manure include the contents of the rumens of slaughtered ruminants, spent grain (left over from brewing beer) and seaweed.

== Uses ==
=== Animal manure ===
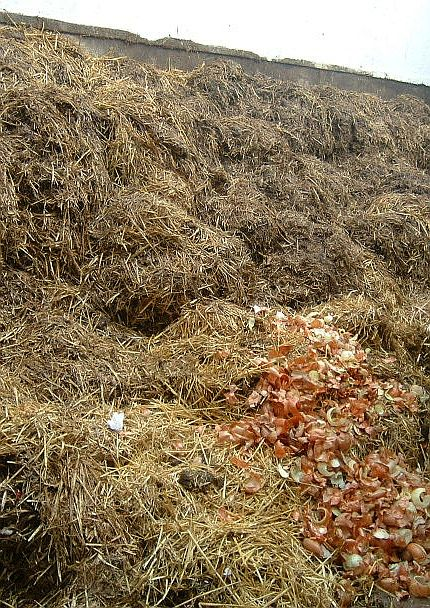
Pile of animal manure on a wall

Animal manure, such as chicken manure and cow dung, has been used for centuries as a fertilizer for farming. It can improve the soil structure (aggregation) so that the soil holds more nutrients and water, and therefore becomes more fertile. Animal manure also encourages soil microbial activity which promotes the soil's trace mineral supply, improving plant nutrition. It also contains some nitrogen and other nutrients that assist the growth of plants.

Odor is an obvious and major issue with animal manure. Components in swine manure include low molecular weight carboxylic acids, acetic, propionic, butyric, and valeric acids. Other components include skatole and trimethyl amine.

Animal manures with a particularly unpleasant odor (such as slurries from intensive pig farming) are usually knifed (injected) directly into the soil to reduce release of the odor. Manure from pigs and cattle is usually spread on fields using a manure spreader. Due to the relatively lower level of proteins in vegetable matter, herbivore manure has a milder smell than the dung of carnivores or omnivores. However, herbivore slurry that has undergone anaerobic fermentation may develop more unpleasant odors, and this can be a problem in some agricultural regions. Poultry droppings are harmful to plants when fresh, but after a period of composting are valuable fertilizers.

Manure is also commercially composted and bagged and sold as a soil amendment.

In 2018, Austrian scientists offered a method of paper production from elephant and cow manure.

Dry animal dung is used as a fuel in many countries around the world.

==== Issues ====
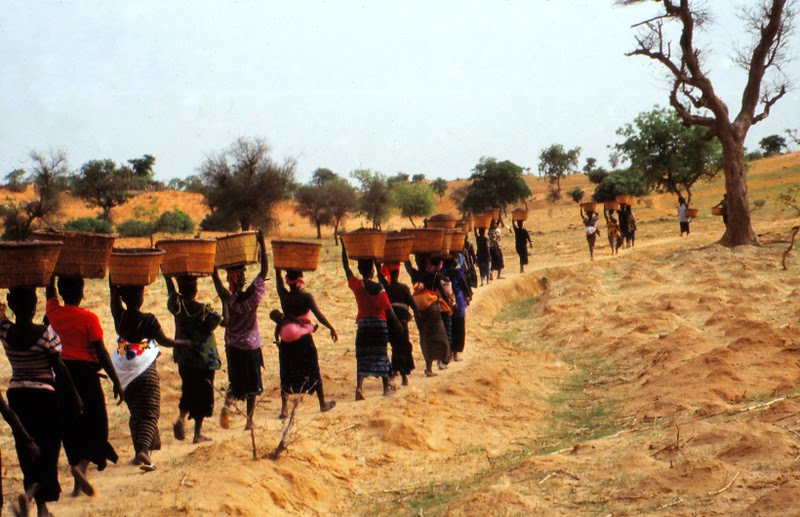
The women of a neighborhood ward with manure on their way to the field of one of them, Tireli, Mali 1990

Any quantity of animal manure may be a source of pathogens or food spoilage organisms which may be carried by flies, rodents, or a range of other vector organisms and cause disease or put food safety at risk.

In intensive agricultural land use, animal manure is often not used as targeted as mineral fertilizers, and thus, the nitrogen utilization efficiency is poor. Animal manure can become a problem in terms of excessive use in areas of intensive agriculture with high numbers of livestock and too little available farmland.

Manure can emit the greenhouse gas nitrous oxide, contributing to climate change.

===== Livestock antibiotics =====
In 2007, a University of Minnesota study indicated that foods such as corn, lettuce, and potatoes have been found to accumulate antibiotics from soils spread with animal manure that contains these drugs.

Organic foods may be much more or much less likely to contain antibiotics, depending on their sources and treatment of manure. For instance, by Soil Association Standard 4.7.38, most organic arable farmers either have their own supply of manure (which would, therefore, not normally contain drug residues) or else rely on green manure crops for the extra fertility (if any nonorganic manure is used by organic farmers, then it usually has to be rotted or composted to degrade any residues of drugs and eliminate any pathogenic bacteria—Standard 4.7.38, Soil Association organic farming standards). On the other hand, as found in the University of Minnesota study, the non-usage of artificial fertilizers, and resulting exclusive use of manure as fertilizer, by organic farmers can result in significantly greater accumulations of antibiotics in organic foods.

== See also ==
- Album graecum
- Anaerobic digestion
- Barn cleaner
- Biosolids
- Chicken manure
- Coprophilous fungus
- Cow dung
- Dry dung fuel
- Earthen manure storage
- Liquid manure
- Manure spreader
- Reuse of human excreta
