= Liquid manure =

Animal waste thinned with water

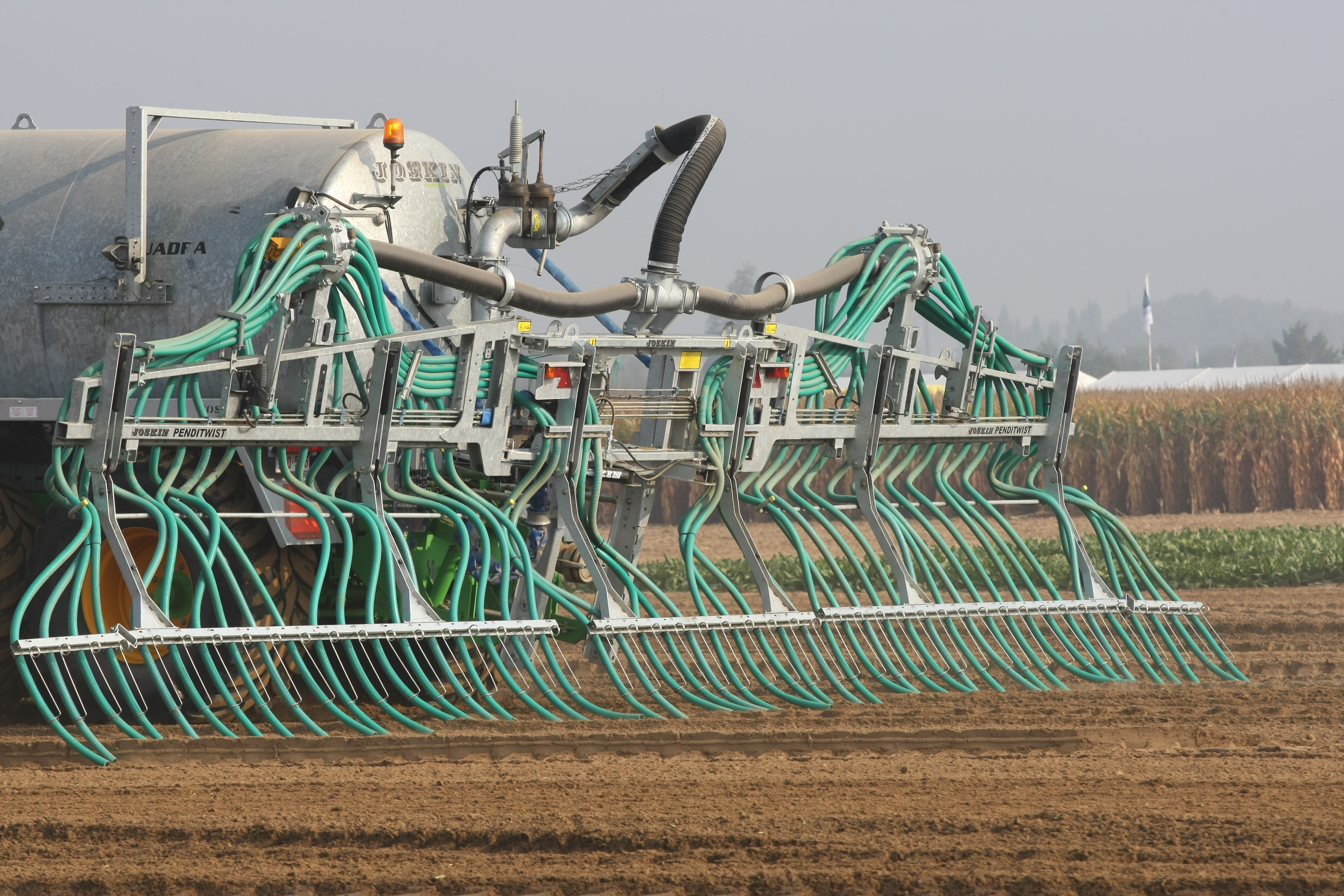
Joskin brand liquid manure spreader at Belgium's Werktuigendagen trade show in 2009

Liquid manure is a mixture of animal waste and organic matter used as an agricultural fertilizer, sometimes thinned with water. It can be aged in a slurry pit to concentrate it.

Liquid manure was developed in the 20th-century as an alternative to fermented manure. Manure in both forms is used as a nutrient-enriched fertilizer for plants, containing high levels of nitrogen, phosphorus, and potassium present in farm animals' excretions and originating from the food they consume.

== History ==
Amy Bogaard, an archaeobotanist at the University of Oxford, suspects that even as early as the Stone Age farmers had noticed the improved fertility of manured land. Her team investigated European digs for crops of cereals such as wheat and barley, as well as pulses such as peas and lentils. Modern-day scholars think that the Babylonian Chronicles and Egyptian hieroglyphs report manuring practices, while Pliny the Elder and Seneca the Younger describe similar Roman and Teuton practices.

Current American fertilizer practice dates back to the Post–World War II economic expansion era. Powerful motorised tractors allowed farmers to haul large, heavy tanks on trailers around their fields, allowing liquids such as liquid manure to be easily and evenly applied near the plant root.

== Role in disease transmission ==
Since at least 1982, health authorities have recognised that the O157:H7 bacteria, which has been responsible for significant numbers of human deaths, spreads through fecal transmission. The strain's low infectious dose, survival under adverse conditions, and potential for extreme disease severity prompt scientific attention. Radish, alfalfa sprouts, green onions as well as leafy green vegetables like lettuce, spinach are prone to be disease vectors, particularly when they are exposed to the pathogen just prior to harvest. In 1998, the United States Food and Drug Administration published the Guide to Minimize Microbial Food Safety Hazards for Fresh Fruits and Vegetables. Particular attention is paid to concentrated animal feeding operations (CAFOs) because they are the source of most of the liquid manure that is spread on fields of vegetables in the United States. Rainwater runoff from these CAFOs was identified in the fatal Walkerton E. coli outbreak as the contaminant of municipal wellwater used for human consumption. Because of the relative infancy of industrial-scale vegetable fertilization by liquid manure, processes to minimize the infection risks were not final by 2007.

== Gallery ==
History of manuring practices

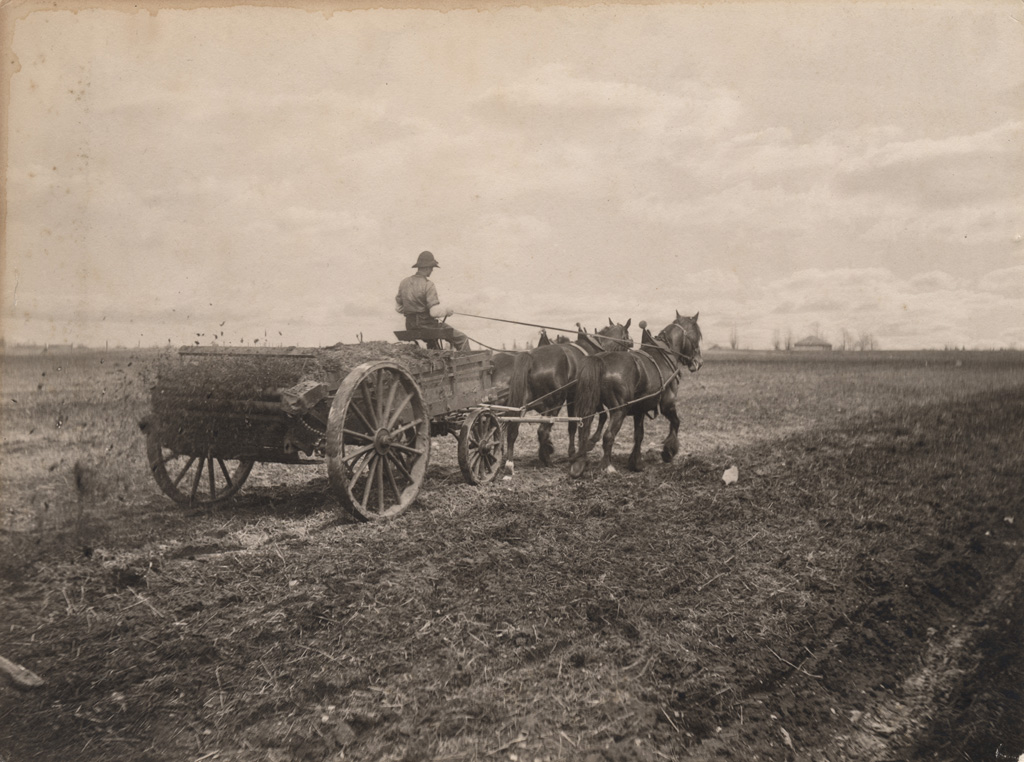
Spreading manure in 1906, photographed by Reuben R. Sallows.

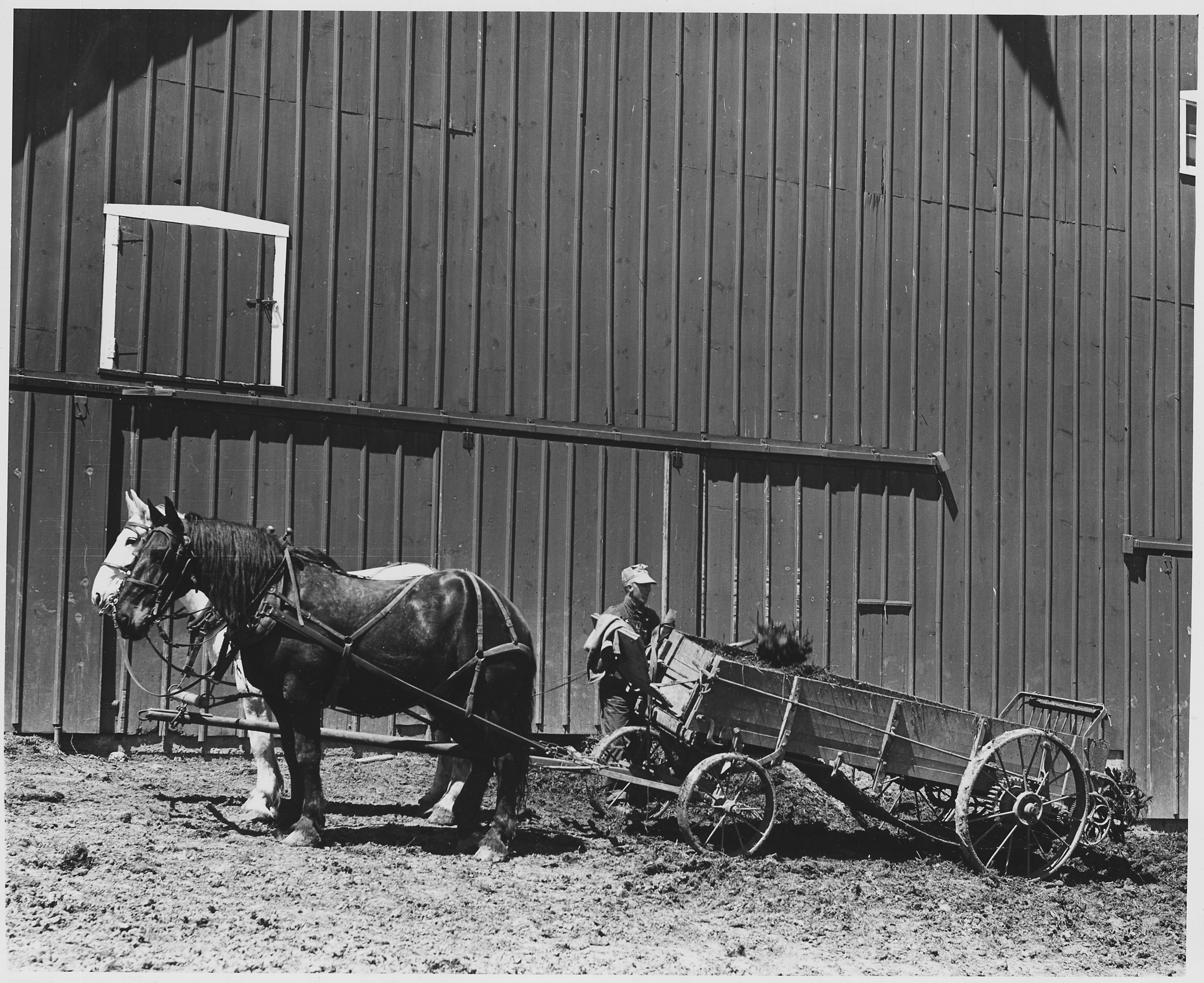
Iowan pre-agribusiness manuring implements

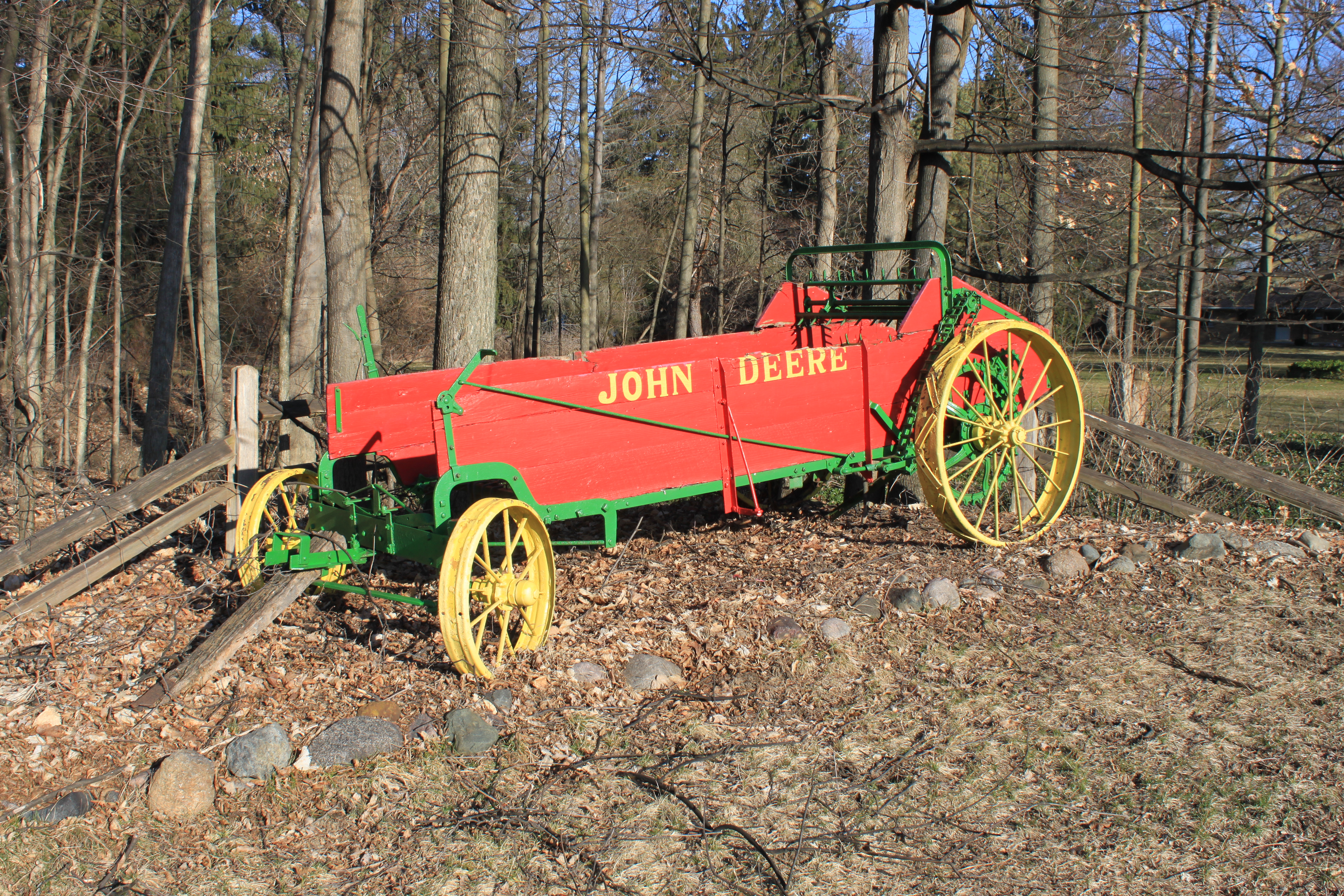
A horse-drawn manure spreader

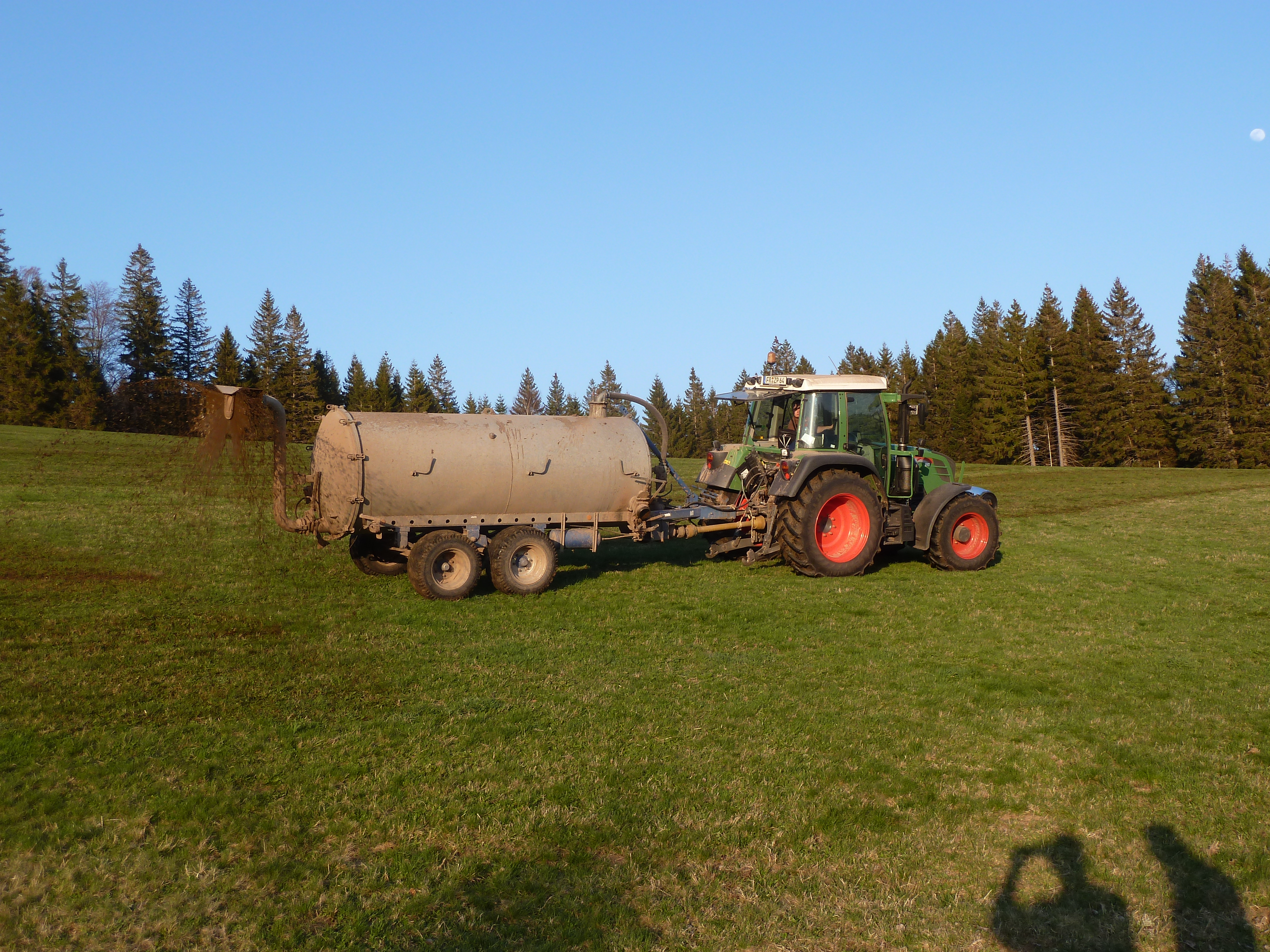
Post-agribusiness era liquid manure spreader

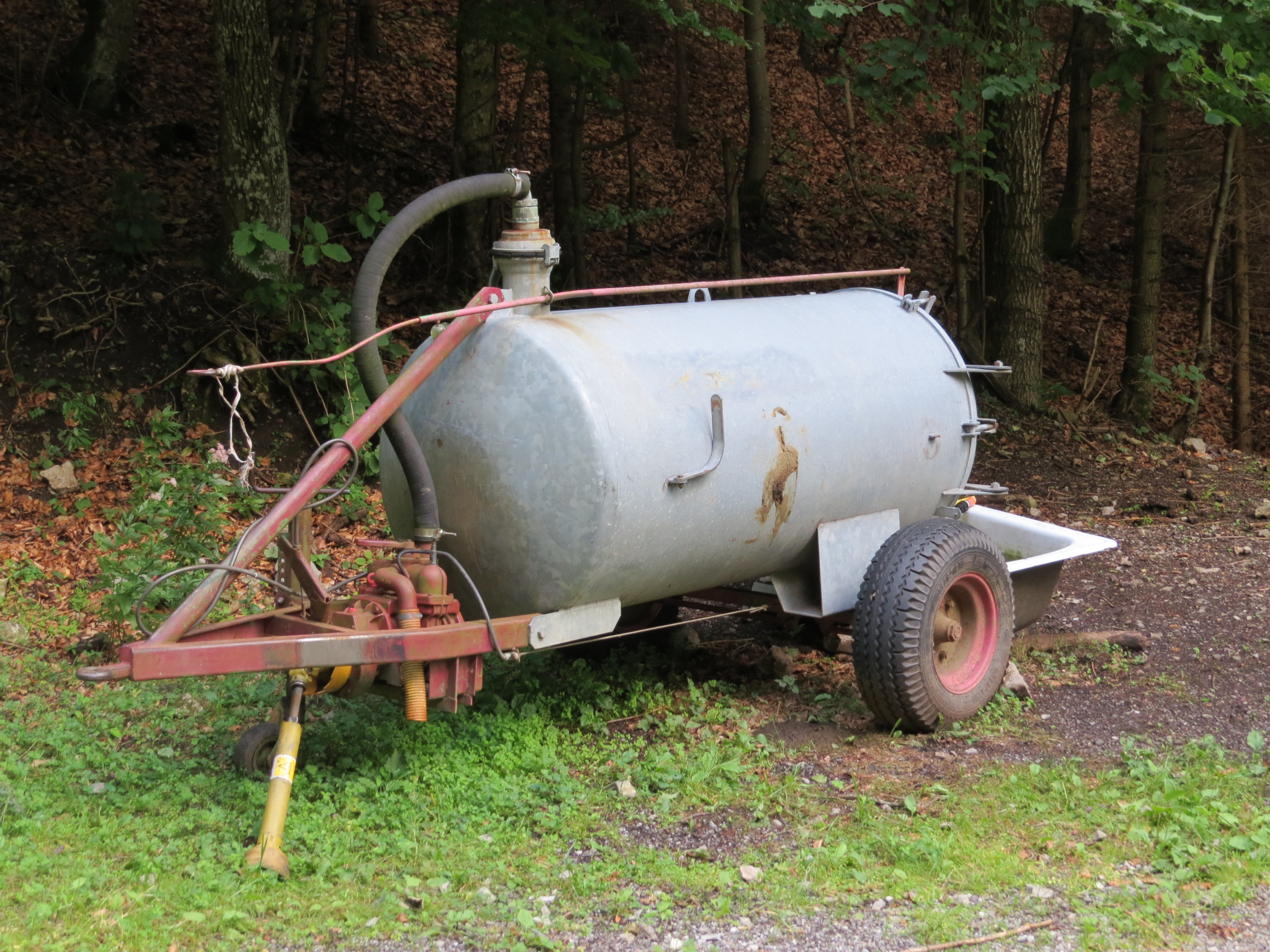
A liquid manure trailer in Austria in 2017

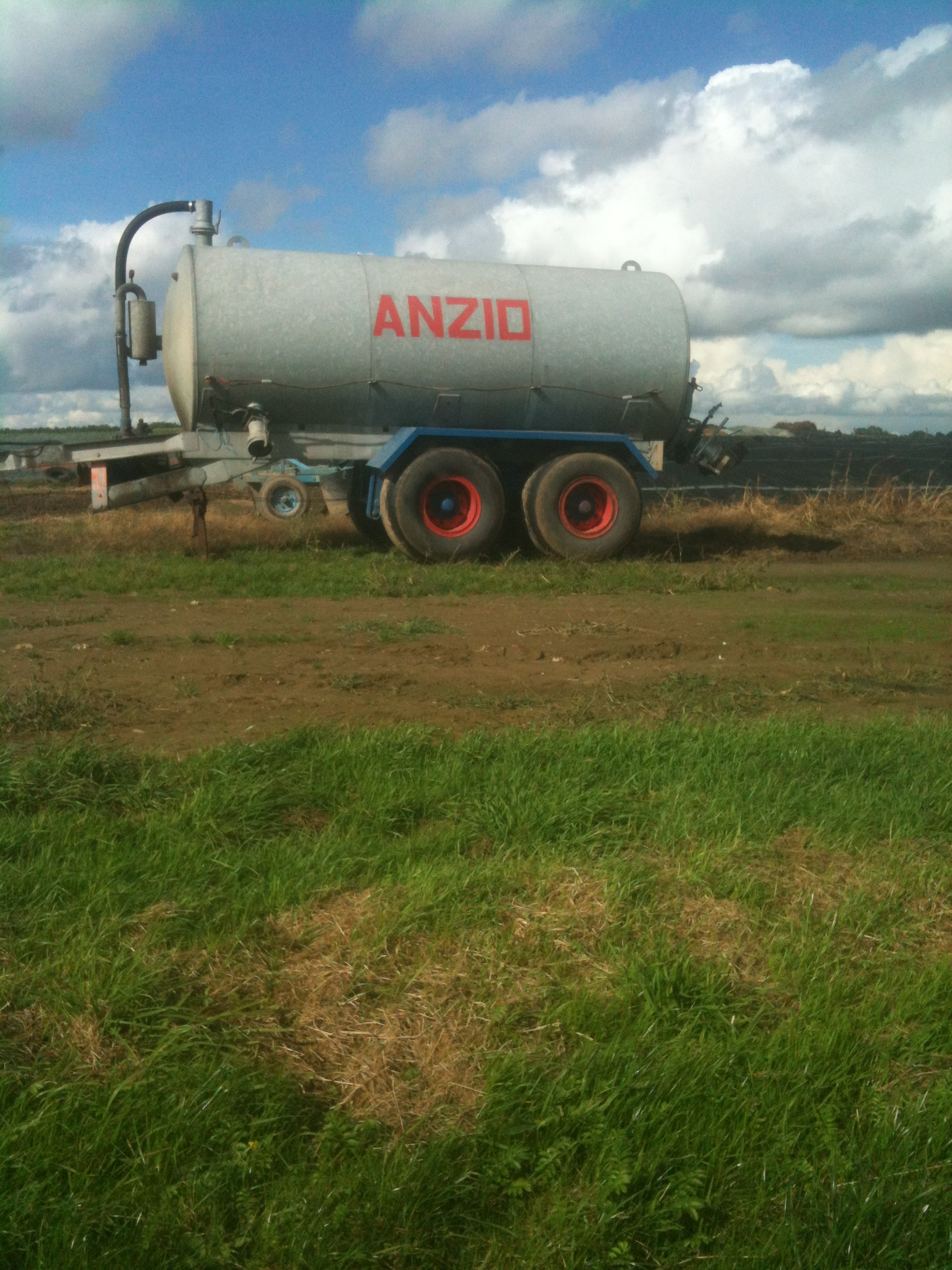
Liquid manure trailer

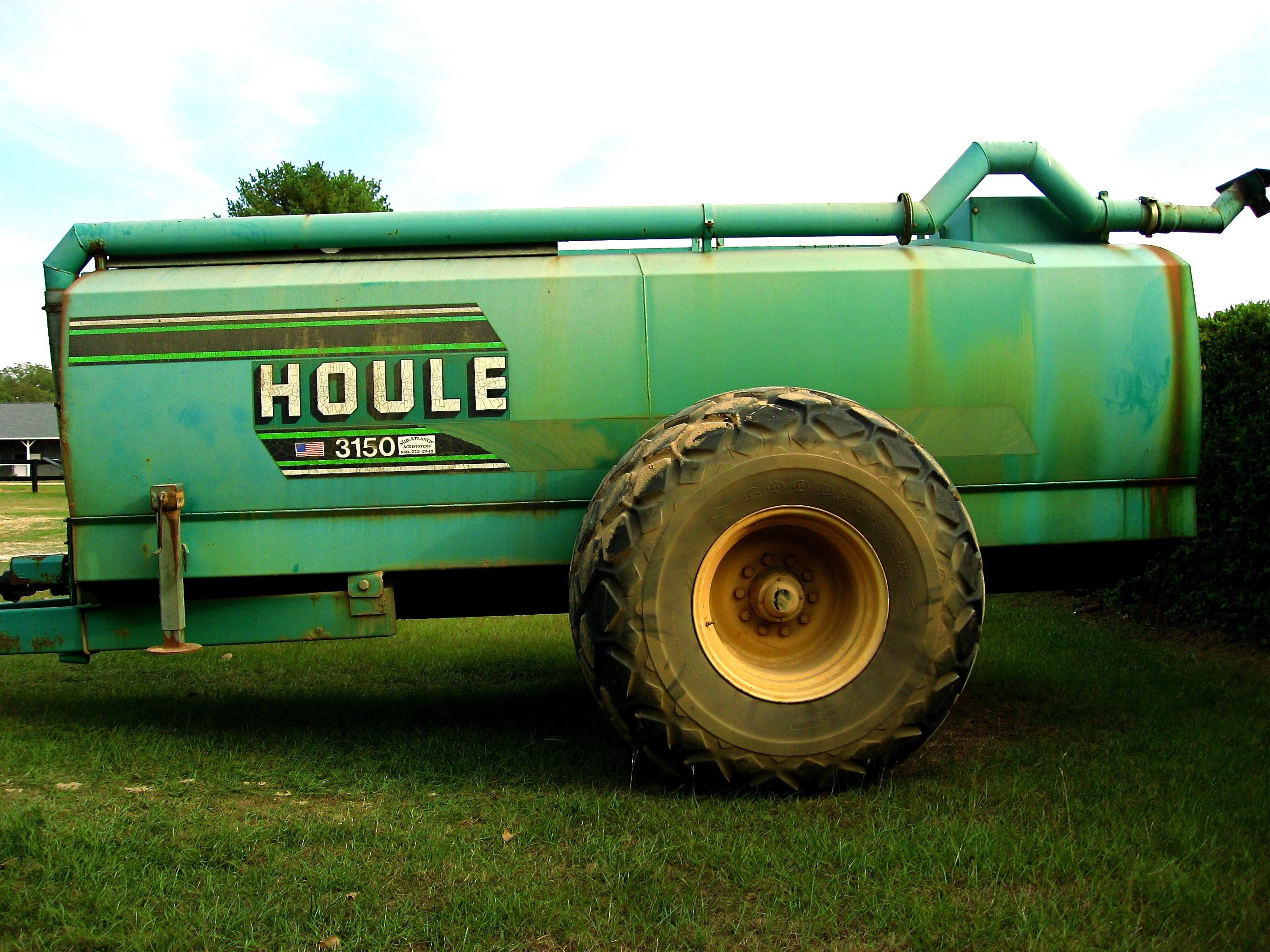
A liquid manure spreader in South Carolina

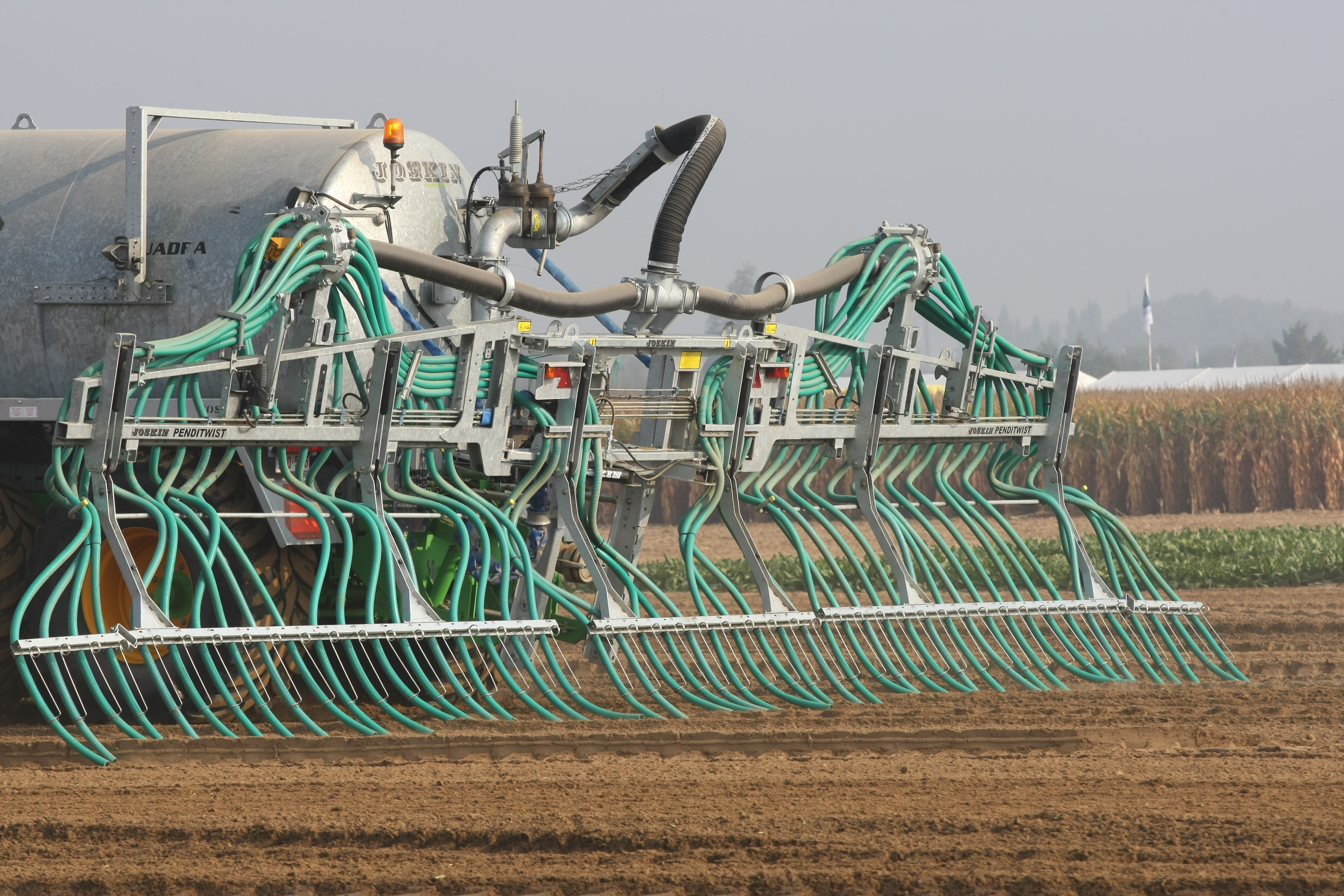
A liquid manure spreader at a trade fair in Belgium in 2009

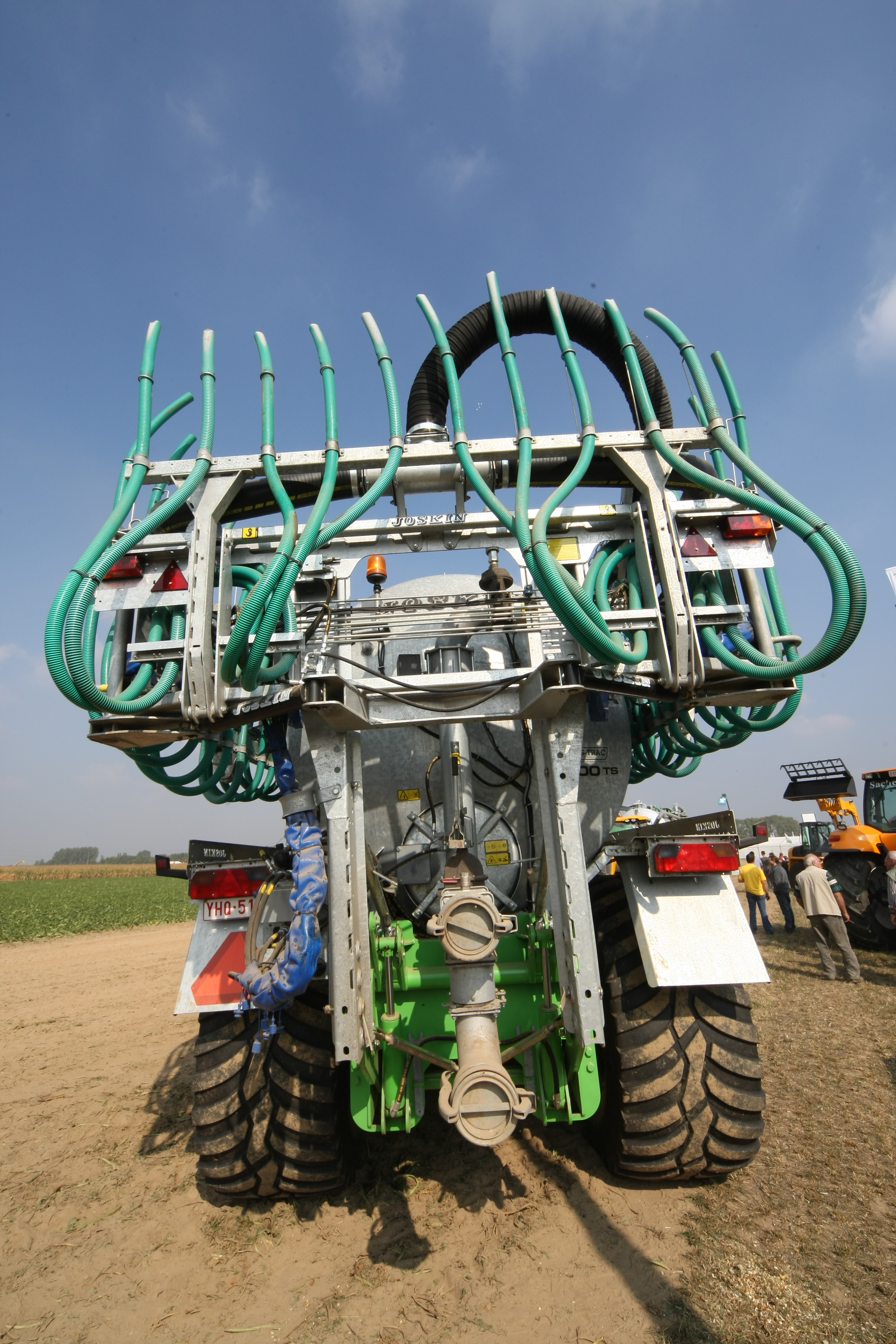
Rear view of a liquid manure spreader at a trade fair in Belgium in 2009

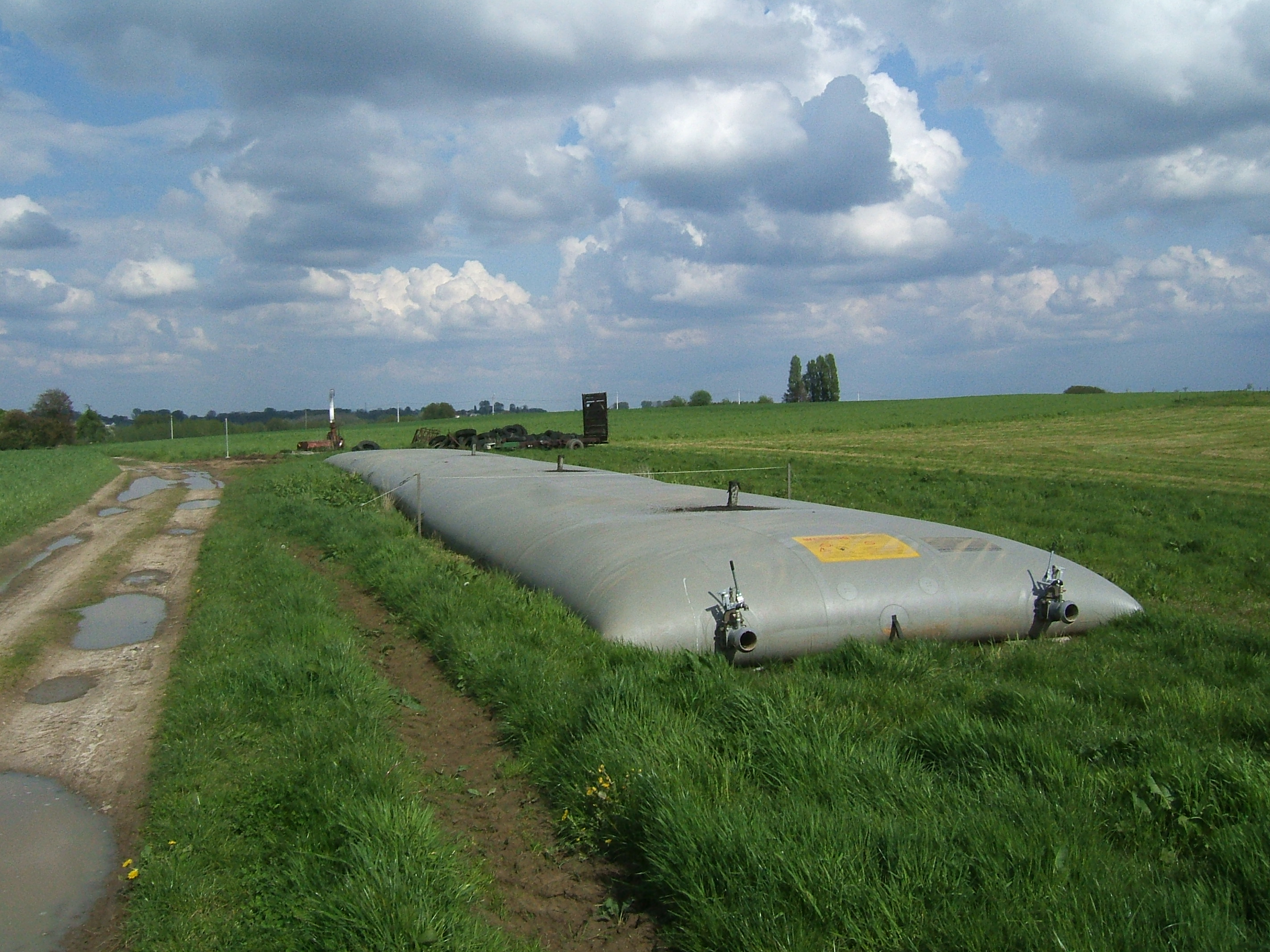
Liquid manure tank in Belgium

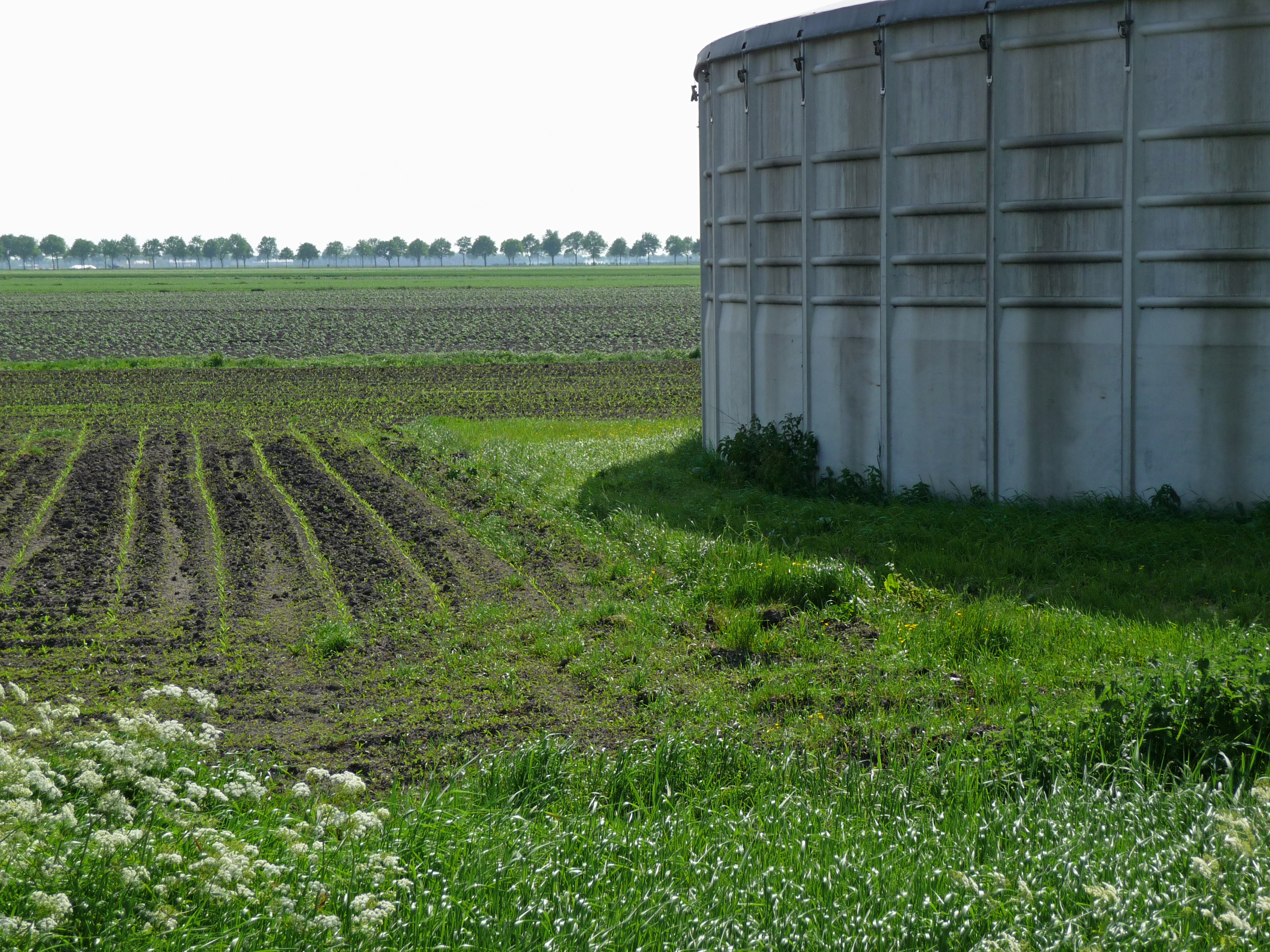
A liquid manure storage silo in the Netherlands in 2012

== See also ==
- Chicken manure
- Cow manure
- Liquid Manure spreader
- Slurry pit
- Feces
