= Lubabegron =

Drug

Clinical data
- Trade names: Experior
- Other names: LY-488756
- ATC code: None

Legal status
- Legal status: Veterinary use only

Identifiers
- IUPAC name: 2-[4-[2-[[(2S)-2-Hydroxy-3-(2-thiophen-2-ylphenoxy)propyl]amino]-2-methylpropyl]phenoxy]pyridine-3-carbonitrile
- CAS Number: 391920-32-4
- PubChem CID: 60085980
- ChemSpider: 28536141
- UNII: 8501207BZX
- KEGG: D10445
- CompTox Dashboard (EPA): DTXSID20192436

Chemical and physical data
- Formula: C_{29}H_{29}N_{3}O_{3}S
- Molar mass: 499.63 g·mol^{−1}

Lubabegron (trade name Experior) is a veterinary drug used to reduce ammonia emissions from animals and their waste. Ammonia emissions are a concern in agricultural production because of detrimental effects on the environment, human health, and animal health.

Lubabegron was approved by the U.S. Food and Drug Administration in 2018 for use in feedlot cattle. It is the first drug approved for reducing ammonia emissions. It is also approved for use in Canada.

Lubabegron is a beta-adrenergic receptor agonist/antagonist. The antagonist activity of lubabegron at β1 and β2 receptors prevents the stimulation of the β-AR found in the heart (β1) and trachea/bronchi (β2) of humans and, in doing so, avoids the potential negative side effects associated with β1 and β2 receptor activation. The β1-AR and β2-AR antagonist behavior of lubabegron could decrease lipolysis in adipose tissue, whereas the β3-AR agonist activity could increase skeletal muscle hypertrophy, possibly due to the differences in the second messenger systems and enzyme expression in skeletal muscle compared with adipose tissues.
