= Feedlot =

Array of pens for feeding livestock

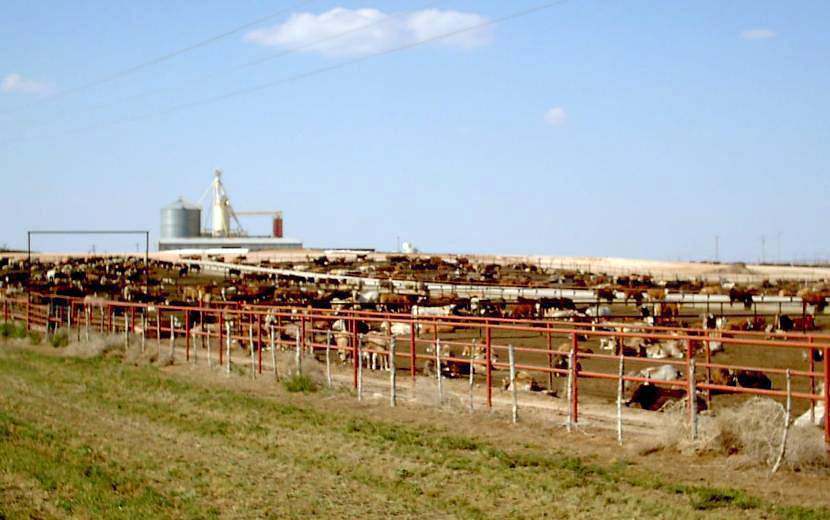
Beef cattle in a feedlot in Texas

A feedlot or feed yard is a type of animal feeding operation (AFO) which is used in intensive animal farming, notably beef cattle, but also swine, horses, sheep, turkeys, chickens or ducks, prior to slaughter. Large beef feedlots are called concentrated animal feeding operations (CAFO) in the United States and intensive livestock operations (ILOs) or confined feeding operations (CFO) in Canada. They may contain thousands of animals in an array of pens, and as of 2016, have been used to fatten over 75% of American steers and heifers used for beef.

The basic purpose of the feedlot is to increase the amount of fat gained by each animal as quickly as possible; if animals are kept in confined quarters rather than being allowed to range freely over grassland, they will gain weight more quickly and efficiently with the economies of scale.

Feedlots require some type of governmental approval to operate, which generally consists of an agricultural site permit. Feedlots also would have an environmental plan in place to deal with the large amount of waste that is generated from the numerous livestock housed. The environmental farm plan is set in place to raise awareness about the environment and covers 23 different aspects around the farm that may affect the environment. The Environmental Protection Agency has authority under the Clean Water Act to regulate all animal feeding operations in the United States. This authority is delegated to individual states in some cases. In Canada, regulation of feedlots is shared between all ;evels of government. Certain provinces are required by law to have a nutrient management plan, which looks at everything the farm is going to feed to their animals, down to the minerals. New farms are required to complete and obtain a license under the livestock operations act, which looks at proper manure storage as well as proper distance away from other farms or dwellings. A mandatory RFID tag is required in every animal that passes through a Canadian feedlot, these are called CCIA tags (Canadian Cattle Identification Agency) which is controlled by the Canadian Food Inspection Agency CFIA. In Australia this role is handled by the National Feedlot Accreditation Scheme (NFAS).

== Scheduling ==
The cattle industry works in sequence with one another, prior to entering a feedlot, young calves are born typically in the spring where they spend the summer with their mothers in a pasture or on rangeland. These producers are called cow-calf operations and are essential for feedlot operations to run. Once the young calves reach a weight between 300 and 700 pounds (140 and 320 kg) they are rounded up and either sold directly to feedlots, or sent to cattle auctions for feedlots to bid on them. Once transferred to a feedlot, they are housed and looked after for the next six to eight months where they are fed a total mixed ration to gain weight.

Feedlot diets encourage growth of muscle mass and the distribution of some fat (known as marbling in butchered meat). The marbling is desirable to consumers, as it contributes to flavour and tenderness. These animals may gain an additional 400-600 pounds (180 kg) during its approximate 200 days in the feedlot, depending on its entrance weight into the lot, and also how well the animal gains muscle. Once cattle are fattened up to their finished weight, the fed cattle are transported to a slaughterhouse.

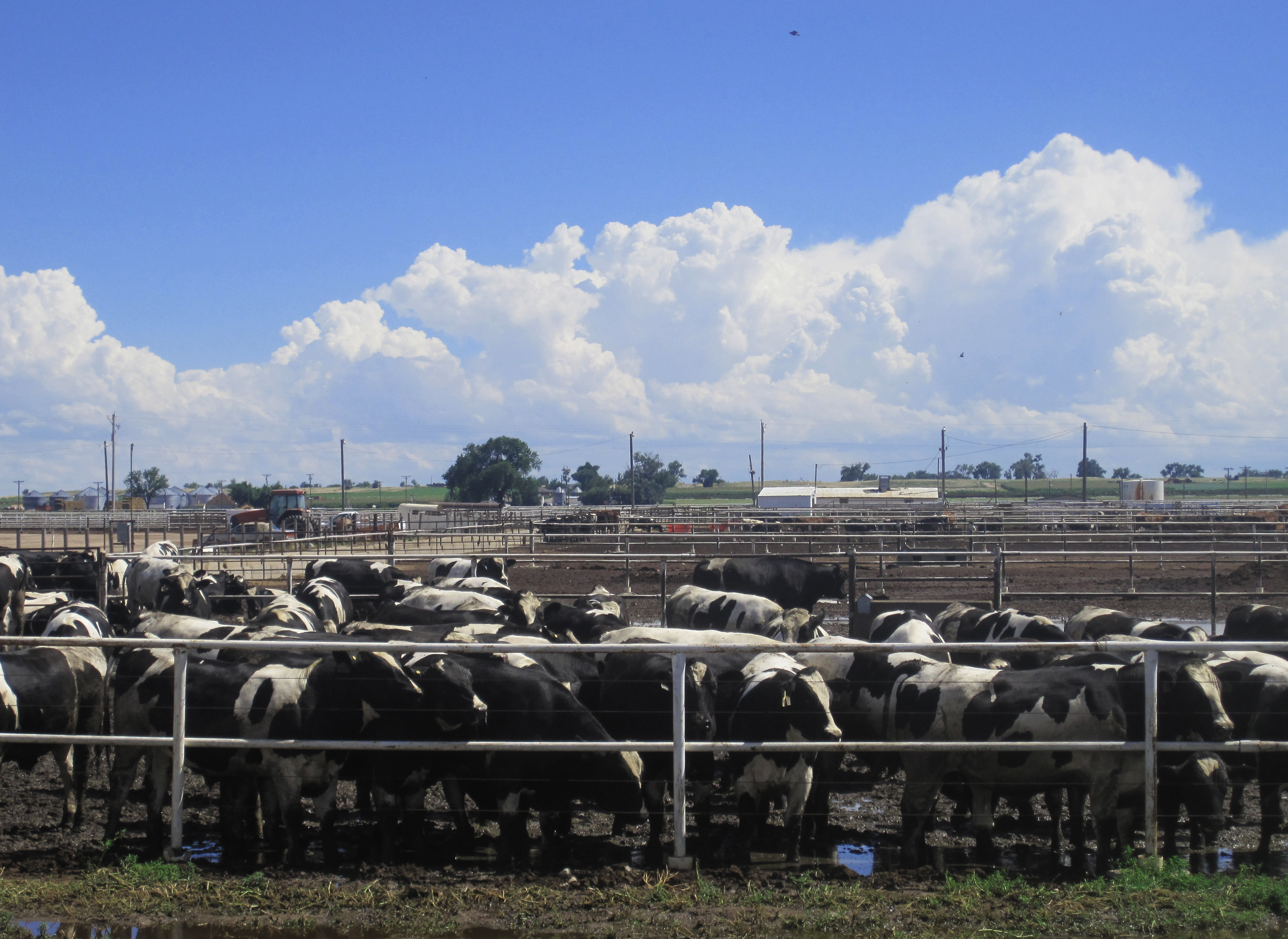
Feedlot near Rocky Ford.

== Diet ==
Typically the total mixed ration (TMR) consist of forage, grains, minerals, and supplements to benefit the animals' health and to maximize feed efficiency. These rations are also known to contain various other forms of feed such as a specialized animal feed which consists of corn, corn byproducts (some of which is derived from ethanol and high fructose corn syrup production), milo, barley, and various grains. Some rations may also contain roughage such as corn stalks, straw, sorghum, or other hay, cottonseed meal, premixes which may contain but not limited to antibiotics, fermentation products, micro & macro minerals and other essential ingredients that are purchased from mineral companies, usually in sacked form, for blending into commercial rations.

Many feed companies are able to be prescribed a drug to be added into a farms feed if required by a vet. Farmers generally work with nutritionists who aid in the formulation of these rations to ensure their animals are getting the recommended levels of minerals and vitamins, but also to make sure the animals are not wasting feed in their manure. In the American northwest and Canada, barley, low grade durum wheat, chick peas (garbanzo beans), oats and occasionally potatoes are used as feed.

In a typical feedlot, a cow's diet is roughly 62% roughage, 31% grain, 5% supplements (minerals and vitamins), and 2% premix. High-grain diets lower the pH in the animals' rumen. Due to the stressors of these conditions, and due to some illnesses, it may be necessary to give the animals antibiotics on occasion.

== Animal health and welfare ==
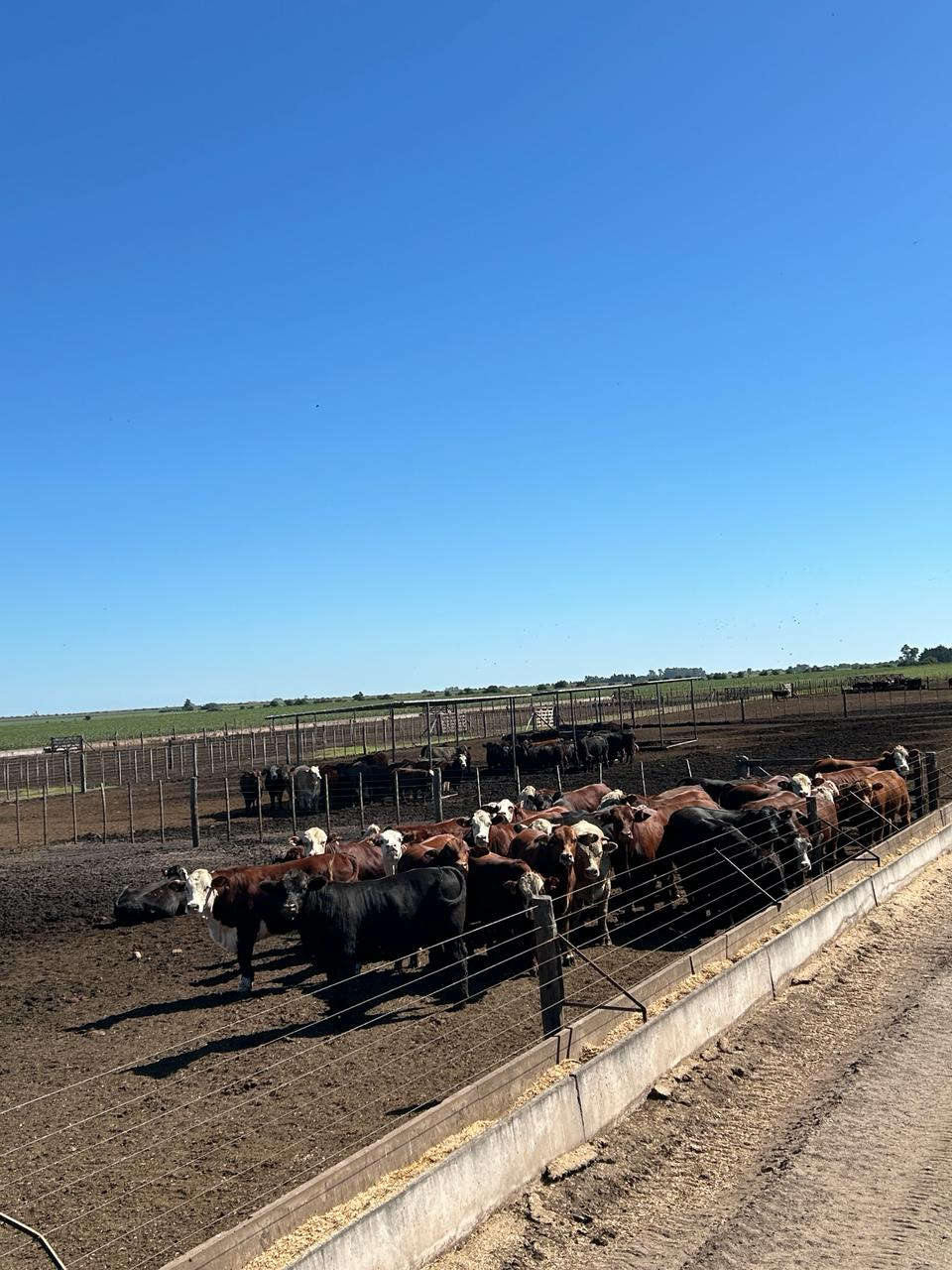
Feedlot in Córdoba, Argentina.

A feedlot is highly dependent on the health of its livestock, as disease can have a great impact on the animals, and controlling sickness can be difficult with numerous animals living together. Many feedlots will have an entrance protocol in which new animals entering the lot are given vaccines to protect them against potential sickness that may arise in the first few weeks in the feedlot. These entrance protocols are usually discussed and created with the farm's veterinarian, as there are numerous factors that can impact the health of feedlot cattle. One challenging but crucial role on a feedlot is to identify any sick cattle, and treat them in order to rebound them back to health. Knowing when an animal is sick is sometimes difficult as cattle are prey animals and will try to hide their weakness from potential threats. A sick animal will generally look gaunt, may have a snotty nose and/or dry nose, and will have droopy ears, catching these symptoms early may be the key to successfully treating an animal. The best indicator of health is the body temperature of a cow, but this is not always possible when looking over many animals per day.

The diet of the animals and the different ingredients within the ration are controversial. Cattle in feedlots are fed grain rather than more natural forage. This is designed to make them gain weight faster, but it leads to internal abscesses and discomfort. Grain-based diets can also lead to the growth of harmful bacteria such as Clostridium perfringens and E. coli. Too much grain in the diet can cause cattle to have issues such as bloating, diarrhea and digestive discomfort, which is why close monitoring of the animals, as well as working with ruminant nutritionists is very important for farmers.

Animal welfare is a pressing subject in intensive agriculture today since consumers have voiced concerns over maltreatments and poor animal health. Indoor feedlots with concrete surfaces can cause leg problems including swollen joints. On outdoor feedlots, welfare issues include mud in rainy areas; heat stress in feedlots that are not shaded; insufficient water to drink; excessive cold, and problems with cattle handling (e.g. electric prods).

Water troughs shared among many cattle can increase the spread of diseases including bovine respiratory disease.

== Waste recycling ==
There are a few common methods of waste recycling within feedlots, with the most common being spreading it back on the cropping fields used to feed the livestock. Generally, feedlots provide animal bedding such as straw, sawdust, wood shaving, or other byproducts from crops (soybean chaff, corn chaff), which then takes up manure during use. Once the bedding has outlasted its use, the manure is either spread directly on the fields or stock piled to breakdown and begin composting. A less common type of recycling in the feedlot industry is liquid manure which is where minimal bedding is found in the manure, so it stays a liquid and is then spread on the fields in a liquid form. Increasing numbers of cattle feedlots are utilizing out-wintering pads made of timber residue bedding in their operations. Nutrients are retained in the waste timber and livestock effluent and can be recycled within the farm system after use. Biogas plants are also able to use livestock manure to create biofuels, and these anaerobic digestion systems are known to capture methane in a usable form, while concentrating nitrogen, a valuable nutrient found in the manure which they then use to spread on their fields.

== History ==
Cattle feeding on a large scale was first introduced in the early 60's, when a demand for higher quality beef in large quantities emerged. Farmers started becoming familiar with the finishing of beef, but also showed interest in various other aspects associated with the feedlot such as soil health, crop management, and how to manage labour costs. From the early 60's to the 90's feeding beef cattle in the feedlot style showed immense growth, and even today the feedlot industry is constantly being upgraded with new knowledge and science as well as technology. In the early 20th century, feeder operations were separate from all other related operations and feedlots were non-existent. They appeared in the 1950s and 1960s as a result of hybrid grains and irrigation techniques; the ensuing larger grain crops led to abundant grain harvests. It was suddenly possible to feed large numbers of cattle in one location and so, to cut transportation costs, grain farms and feedlot locations merged. Cattle were no longer sent from all across the southern states to places like California, where large slaughter houses were located. In the 1980s, meat packers followed the path of feedlots and are now located close by to them as well.

== Marketing ==
There are many methods used to sell cattle to meat packers. Spot, or cash, marketing is the traditional and most commonly used method. Prices are influenced by current supply & demand and are determined by live weight or per head. Similar to this is forward contracting, in which prices are determined the same way but are not directly influenced by market demand fluctuations. Forward contracts determine the selling price between the two parties negotiating for a set amount of time. However, this method is the least used because it requires some knowledge of production costs and the willingness of both sides to take a risk in the futures market. Another method, formula pricing, is becoming the most popular process, as it more accurately represents the value of meat received by the packer. This requires trust between the packers and feedlots though, and is under criticism from the feedlots because the amount paid to the feedlots is determined by the packers' assessment of the meat received. Finally, live- or carcass-weight based formula pricing is most common. Other types include grid pricing and boxed beef pricing. The most controversial marketing method stems from the vertical integration of packer-owned feedlots, which still represents less than 10% of all methods, but has been growing over the years.

== Alternatives ==
The alternative to feedlots is to allow cattle to graze on grass throughout their lives. Grazing cattle generally show less stress indicators due to more space and natural behaviour than by being confined in feedlots. Well-managed grazing can improve soil health, biodiversity, and sequester carbon. For Canada and the Northern USA, continuous grazing isn't possible in severe winters, which is why catle are often moved to feedlots - but extended-grazing systems keep many cattle to graze on grass well into or through winter, reducing confinement. Some consider cattle grazing as less efficient and challenging. A 2012 life-cycle analysis found that producing beef from grass-fed cattle required more animals, land, and water than conventional feedlot finishing.

== See also ==
- Intensive fish farm – Raising fish commercially in enclosures
- Golden Triangle of Meat-packing – Industrial concentration in southwestern Kansas
- Livestock – Animals kept to produce material goods
- Managed intensive grazing – System of grazing moving animals between paddocks around the year
- Temple Grandin – American academic and autism activist (born 1947)
