= Out-wintering pads =

Out-wintering pads (OWPs) are a cattle-housing system in which a layer of timber residue (often ~50 mm woodchips is placed over an artificially drained surface to control solid and liquid excreta from animal confinement. In some climates such as the United Kingdom and Ireland, OWPs allow livestock to be housed outdoors over winter.

“Spent” timber residues (STRs, timber residues soiled with animal excreta) can be applied to land as a source of organic matter and nutrients.
