= Animal feeding operation =

The United States Environmental Protection Agency (EPA) defines an animal feeding operation (AFO) in the Code of Federal Regulations (CFR, Federal Register, V. 68 No. 1, page 7265) as a lot or facility (other than an aquatic animal production facility) where the following conditions are met:

- Animals (other than aquatic animals) have been, are, or will be stabled or confined and fed or maintained for a total of 45 days or more in any 12-month period, and
- Crops, vegetation, forage growth, or post-harvest residues are not sustained in the normal growing season over any portion of the facility.

The definition of an AFO was developed by the EPA as a regulatory definition to delineate confined feeding of beef cattle, dairy cattle, horses, swine, sheep, poultry, or other livestock from pasture-based systems (grazing systems were not meant to be regulated by EPA) for enforcement of the Clean Water Act. The AFO classification is meant to apply to all sizes of operations and is the first step in defining an operation as a Concentrated Animal Feeding Operation (CAFO). Concentrated Animal Feeding Operations are facilities that require federal National Pollutant Discharge Elimination System (NPDES) water quality permits, irrespective of size. While state regulations differ from state to state, changes in 2003 to the NPDES permit program forced most state programs to adopt the AFO and CAFO designations, and thus the regulatory definition of an AFO is common across the United States.

== Size designation ==
EPA did not explicitly differentiate AFOs by size in the Code of Federal Regulations, but is commonly understood as follows.

Classification of AFOs follows the delineation of CAFOs, small, medium, and large. Large AFOs are automatically termed Large CAFOs based on size designation alone.

A small AFO would be delineated as follows:

- 1 to 199 mature dairy cows, whether milked or dry;
- 1 to 299 veal calves;
- 1 to 299 cattle other than mature dairy cows or veal calves;
- 1 to 749 swine each weighing 55 pounds or more;
- 1 to 2,999 swine each weighing less than 55 pounds;
- 1 to 149 horses;
- 1 to 2,999 sheep or lambs;
- 1 to 16,499 turkeys;
- 1 to 8,999 laying hens, or broilers, if the AFO uses a liquid manure handling system;
- 1 to 37,499 chickens (other than laying hens), if the AFO uses other than a liquid manure handling system;
- 1 to 24,999 laying hens, if the AFO uses other than a liquid manure handling system;
- 1 to 9,999 ducks (if the AFO uses other than a liquid manure handling system); or
- 1 to 1,499 ducks (if the AFO uses a liquid manure handling system);

A medium AFO would be delineated as follows:

- 200 to 699 mature dairy cows, whether milked or dry;
- 300 to 999 veal calves;
- 300 to 999 cattle other than mature dairy cows or veal calves;
- 750 to 2,499 swine each weighing 55 pounds or more;
- 3,000 to 9,999 swine each weighing less than 55 pounds;
- 150 to 499 horses;
- 3,000 to 9,999 sheep or lambs;
- 16,500 to 54,999 turkeys;
- 9,000 to 29,999 laying hens, or broilers, if the AFO uses a liquid manure handling system;
- 37,500 to 124,999 chickens (other than laying hens), if the AFO uses other than a liquid manure handling system;
- 25,000 to 81,999 laying hens, if the AFO uses other than a liquid manure handling system;
- 10,000 to 29,999 ducks (if the AFO uses other than a liquid manure handling system); or
- 1,500 to 4,999 ducks (if the AFO uses a liquid manure handling system);

== Criteria for CAFO designation ==
Small and medium AFOs can be designated as Concentrated Animal Feeding Operations based on their risk to surface water. There are two conditions EPA and state regulatory authorities consider that if either are met, change the designation of an AFO to that of a CAFO.

1. Pollutions are discharged into waters of the United States through a man-made flushing system, or other similar device; or
2. Pollutants are discharged directly into waters of the United States which originate outside of and pass over, across, or through the facility or otherwise come into direct contact with the animals confined in the operation.

This is often interpreted by regulators to mean that water runoff, manure, or process wastewater that can leave a facility and can come into contact with surface water, such as a road ditch, stream, river, pond, dam or similar watercourse, meets this definition, and thus pull medium AFOs into the permit program. EPA means for a medium AFO that meets this contact with surface water criteria to apply for coverage under the NPDES permit program (then designated a medium CAFO). However, for small AFOs the state regulatory authority must designate the operation as a CAFO in order for them to meet the definition of a small CAFO.
