= Lena Kenin =

American physician

Lena Nemerovsky Kenin
- Born: Lena Nemerovsky; November 5, 1897; Portland, Oregon, US
- Died: March 24, 1968 (aged 70)
- Education: Reed College; University of Washington (BS); University of Oregon Medical School (MD)

Lena Nemerovsky Kenin (November 5, 1897 – March 24, 1968) was an American physician known for her contributions to obstetrics, gynecology, and psychiatry, particularly in the area of postpartum depression.

== Early life and education ==
Lena Nemerovsky was born in Portland, Oregon, to David and Naomi (Swartz) Nemerovsky. She was the third youngest of six children. Kenin initially attended Reed College and later graduated with a Bachelor of Science degree from the University of Washington in 1921. Following her undergraduate studies, she worked as a schoolteacher for three years. In 1924, she enrolled at the Oregon Health & Science University (then known as University of Oregon Medical School), where she earned her Doctor of Medicine degree in 1929. After obtaining her medical degree, she interned at Good Samaritan Hospital in Portland. In 1933, she became the first female resident at the Johns Hopkins University department of obstetrics and gynecology.

== Career ==
After completing her residency, Kenin established a practice in obstetrics and gynecology in Portland, where she practiced for over twenty-five years. She became known for her patient care approach, redesigning her office in the mid-1950s with a private second door to improve privacy for expectant mothers, allowing them to exit without going through the waiting room.

In 1958, Kenin left Portland to enroll in a psychiatric program at the University of Pennsylvania. She completed her residency at Johns Hopkins Hospital and the Philadelphia Hospital for Mental and Nerve Disorders before returning to Portland in 1961 to establish a psychiatric practice. In 1962, Kenin and her colleague Norman Blass co-authored the article Mental Illness Associated with the Postpartum State in the journal Clinical Obstetrics and Gynecology. This article contributed to the understanding of postpartum depression and its effects on maternal health.

In addition to her private practice, Kenin served as an associate professor of psychiatry at the University of Oregon Medical School and was the chief consultant for health services for students.

== Personal life ==
Lena Kenin married Harry Marvin Kenin, a lawyer and future Oregon State Senator from Philadelphia, on November 21, 1921. The couple were registered Democrats, and Lena Kenin became a member of the Americans for Democratic Action in 1947. Harry Kenin died in 1954, and Lena Kenin died on March 24, 1968. The couple had no children.
