= Cow–calf operation =

Method of raising beef cattle

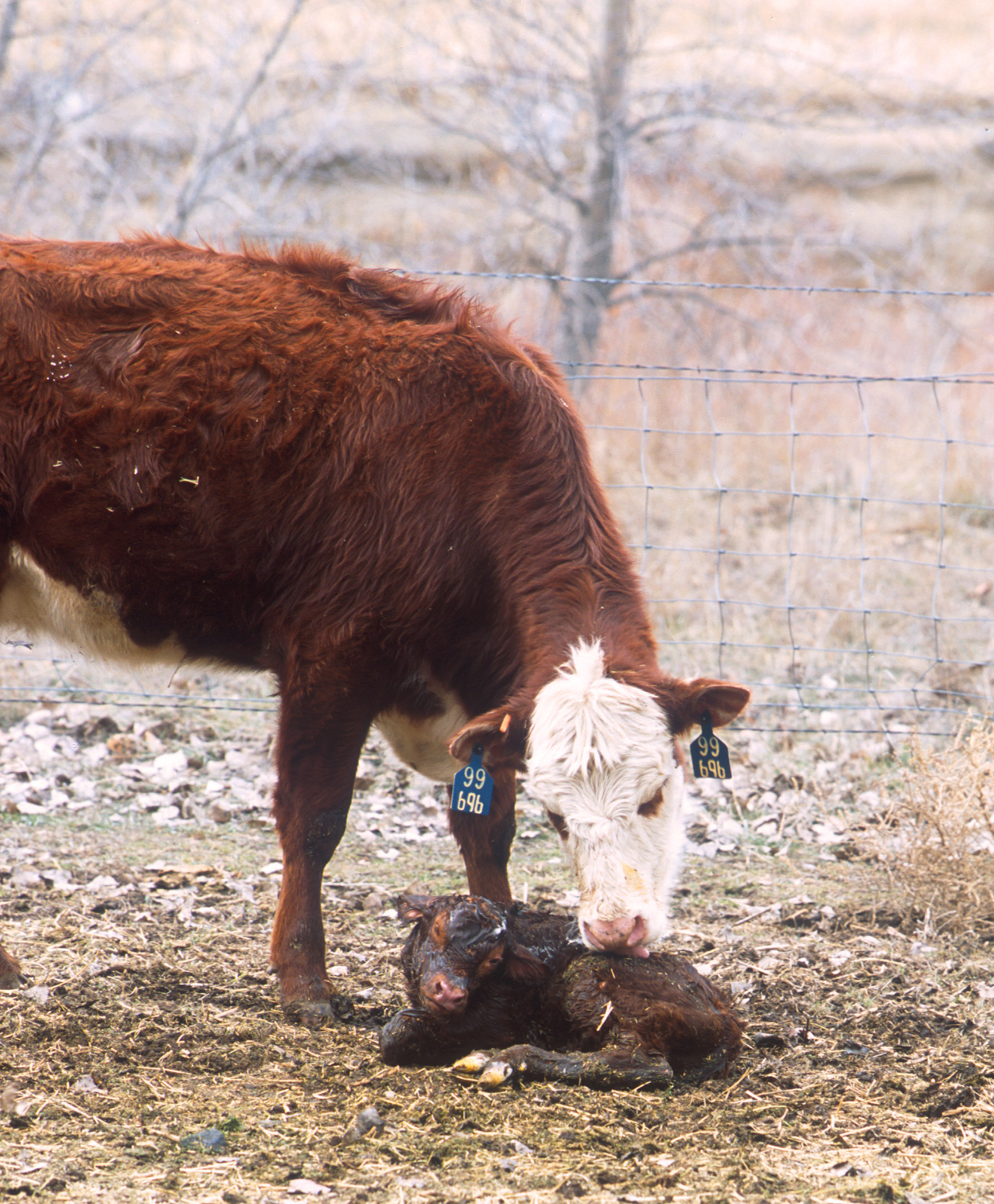
A Hereford cow licks her newborn calf clean.

A cow calf operation is a method of rearing beef cattle in which a permanent herd of cows is kept by a farmer or rancher to produce calves for later sale. Cow–calf operations are one of the key aspects of the beef industry in the United States and many other countries. In the British Isles, a cow–calf operation may be known as a single-suckler herd. The goal of a cow–calf operation is to produce young beef cattle, which are usually sold. A rancher who works within such a model is often called a cow–calf operator in the United States.

== General characteristics ==
Cow–calf operations are widespread throughout beef-producing countries, and the goal of a cow–calf operation is to produce young beef cattle, which are usually sold. True to the name, farm and ranch herds consist mostly of adult female cows, their calves, and young females, called heifers, which will produce calves once of breeding age. Some operations may raise their steers until slaughter weight, others sell them as weaned calves. They may have a few herd bulls and utilize natural mating, but may have no bulls and rely primarily on artificial insemination. Cattle from a cow–calf operation may be sold after they have been weaned to be matured elsewhere, such as at a feedlot, or may be raised to near-slaughter weight and sold at the age of 1–2 years. Older cows and bulls, if kept, may also be sold to slaughter after their reproductive years have ended.

Cow–calf operations generally raise their stock primarily on pasture and other forms of roughage rather than grain feeds, though they may provide vitamin and mineral supplementation. For this reason, they require more land than other cattle operations, such as feedlots, veal and dairy cattle production, or breeding operations that focus primarily on the management of bulls for artificial insemination. Pastures may be native or "improved" with forage designed to withstand grazing pressure and help animals gain weight. During periods of shortage, supplementary feeding may be carried out but it is by no means universal. In some areas, pasture is supported by crops for fattening. Intensive rotational grazing systems can reduce the amount of land required; an acre or an acre and half, in some climates, can support a single cow–calf pair for an entire year. Conversely, in countries such as Brazil and Argentina, cow–calf operations may be forced to use more marginal grazing because of changes in the value of land due to high prices for cash crops like soybeans.

Auctions are a common means of sale, although in some cases, prospective buyers inspect sale cattle on the producer's property with the price negotiated either by weight or on a dollars per head basis.

== In the United States ==
Cow–calf operations are generally divided into two types. First are those that produce feeder cattle to be raised by other agricultural enterprises, such as feedlots. These sell their calves after they have been weaned and are under a year in age. The second are those that raise the calves for 1–2 years before selling them directly to slaughter.

The mother cattle, sometimes known as brood cows, generally come from one of two sources: either female calves raised on the farm itself and retained into adulthood, or cows that are purchased from a specialized seedstock operation which often produces purebred cattle.

Cow–calf operations are widespread throughout the United States. A 1997 census found that this sector of the U.S. beef market produced over $40.5 billion. As of 2007 there were more than 765,000 cow–calf operators in the country, mostly concentrated in the Western and Southeastern U.S. states.

Sale prices for calves sold from a cow–calf operation are subject to fluctuation as part of the cattle cycle of financial markets. The relatively long period it takes a cow–calf operator to build up a beef herd and raise new calves to the desired weight tends to extend the length of such a cycle.

== In Australia ==
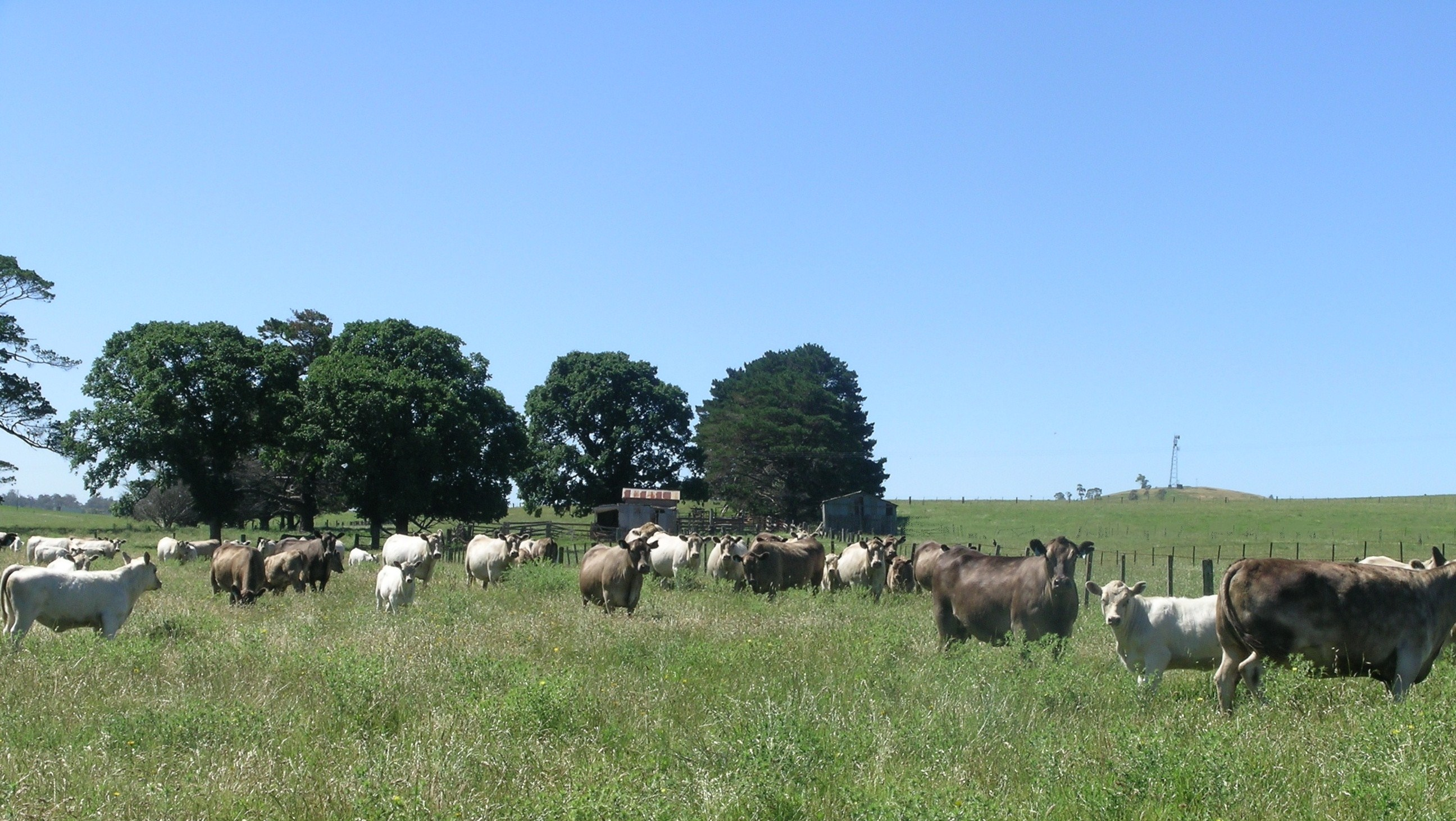
Murray Grey cows and calves on the Northern Tablelands

Approximately 90% of Australian cows are in strictly cow–calf operations. In southern Australia (New South Wales, Victoria, Tasmania, South Australia and south-western Western Australia) beef cattle are often reared on smaller properties as part of a mixed farming or grazing operation, but some properties do specialise in cattle breeding. The southern calves are typically reared on pasture and sold as weaners, yearlings or as steers at about two years old or older.

In the Top End, sub-tropical areas and in arid inland regions cattle are bred on native pastures on expansive cattle stations. Beef producers in northern Australia tend to operate more extensive pastoral enterprises than counterparts in southern Australia. Anna Creek Station in South Australia is the world's largest working cattle station. The North Australian Pastoral Company Pty Limited (NAPCO) is now one of Australia's largest beef cattle producers, with a herd of over 180,000 cattle and fourteen cattle stations in Queensland and the Northern Territory. The Australian Agricultural Company (AA Co) manages a cattle herd of more than 585,000 head. Heytesbury Beef Pty Ltd owns and manages over 200,000 head of cattle across eight stations spanning the East Kimberley, Victoria River and Barkly Tablelands regions in Northern Australia. Most cattle from these regions are exported as manufacturing beef or as live animals under 350 kilograms live weight to South-East Asia for fattening in feedlots there.

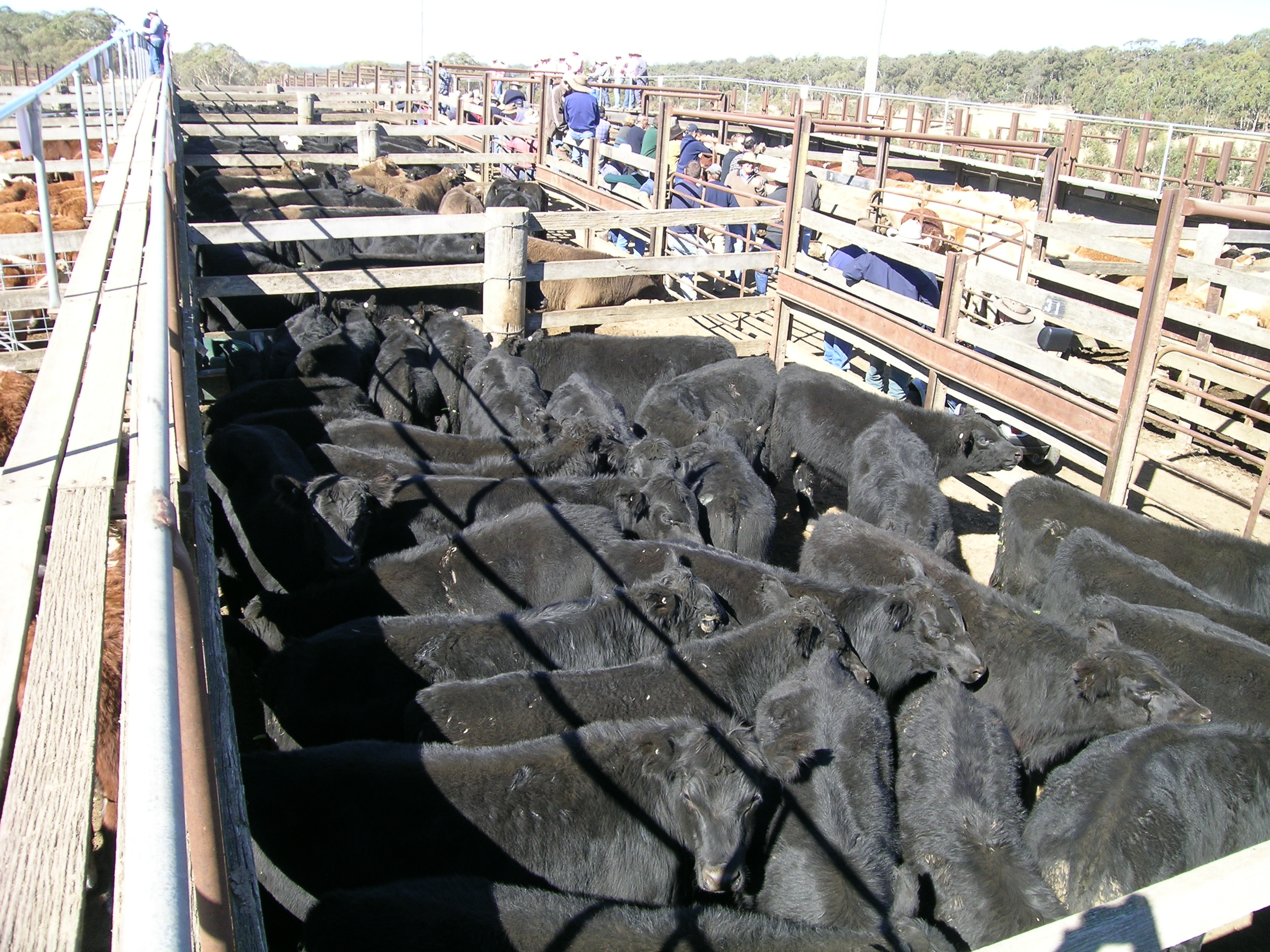
Weaner calves for sale by auction

A variety of selling methods are used in Australia and cattle may be sold as studs, store or finished stock. A number of different selling methods are used, depending on the age, type and condition of cattle and the markets.

== See also ==
- Cow-calf separation
