= Birth spacing =

In woman's pregnancy, time between births

Birth spacing, pregnancy spacing, inter-birth interval (IBI) or inter-pregnancy interval refers to how soon after a prior pregnancy a woman becomes pregnant or gives birth again. There are health risks associated both with pregnancies placed closely together and those placed far apart, but the majority of health risks are associated with births that occur too close together. The WHO recommends 24 months between pregnancies. A shorter interval may be appropriate if the pregnancy ended in abortion or miscarriage. If the mother has had a prior C-section, it is advisable to wait before giving birth again due to the risk of uterine rupture in the mother during childbirth, with recommendations of a minimum inter-delivery interval ranging from a year to three years. Pregnancy intervals longer than five years are associated with an increased risk of pre-eclampsia. The global public health burden of short inter-pregnancy intervals is substantial. Family planning can help increase inter-pregnancy intervals.

== Factors influencing birth spacing ==
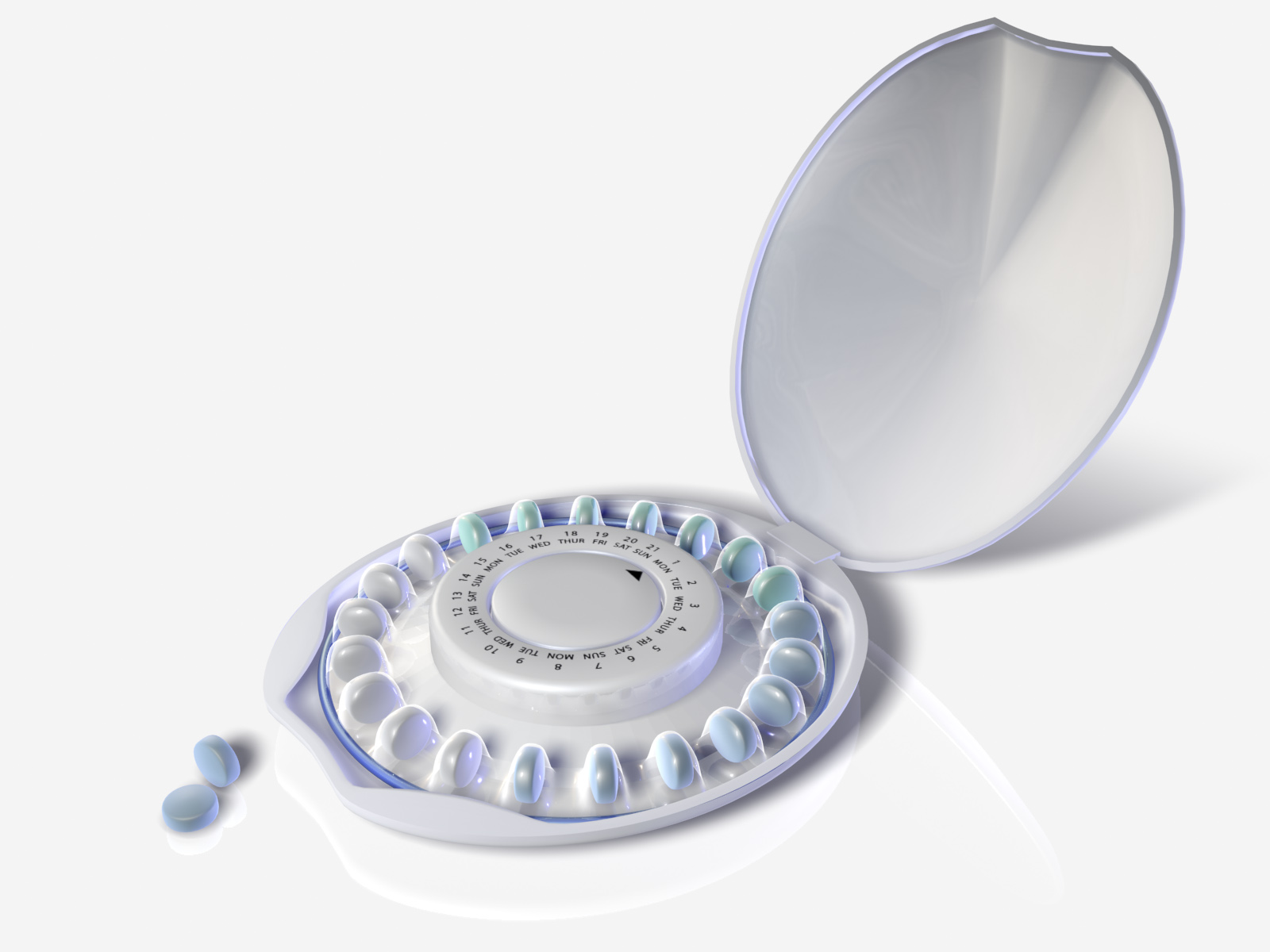
Contraceptives, such as the birth control pill, can help increase inter-pregnancy interval, if desired.

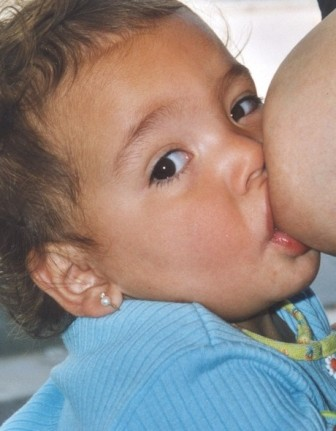
Breastfeeding can increase time between births.

Family planning, such as the use of contraceptives can increase the inter-pregnancy interval. Breastfeeding and extended breastfeeding can also increase birth spacing due to lactational amenorrhea.

Cultural and religious attitudes towards both sex and the use of contraceptives, price and availability of health care, and poverty are all factors which can affect inter-pregnancy intervals.

== Health risks ==
=== Short inter-pregnancy interval ===
A short inter-pregnancy interval is associated with an increase in maternal mortality, stillbirth, and child mortality. An inter-pregnancy interval of lower than 18 months is associated with an increased risk of pre-term birth.

A short inter-pregnancy interval after a prior C-section can be a contraindication for having a vaginal birth after a prior C-section (VBAC). In one study inter-pregnancy intervals shorter than 6 months were associated with 2-3 times increased risk of uterine rupture, major morbidity, and blood transfusion during vaginal delivery in mothers with at least one prior C-section.

Complications of a short inter-pregnancy interval are lower after an abortion or miscarriage compared to a full-term pregnancy.

=== Long inter-pregnancy interval ===
An inter-pregnancy interval of greater than five years is associated with an increased risk of pre-eclampsia.

== Child development ==
In one study taking place in Saudi Arabia, children born after a short birth interval (under 17 months) were more likely to have poorer performance at school and poorer cognitive development. The risk of accidental injury also increases with a decreasing birth interval. Long IPIs greater than 24 months were associated with language deficits, and greater than 60 months were associated with an increased risk of deficits in communication skills and less general knowledge.

== Public health ==
The global public health burden of short inter-pregnancy intervals is substantial. In developing countries, children born two years or earlier after an older sibling were at a 60% increased risk of death in infancy, while those born between two and three years had a 10% increase, compared with those born after intervals of four to five years. Various organisations, including the World Health Organization have identified birth spacing as an important area of public health intervention. Evidence for causality of these associations in high-resource environments is weak.

== Epidemiology ==
In one study, the average birth interval across all countries was 32.1 months (2.7 years). The region with the greatest percentage of short interbirth intervals was central Asia, where a third of children were born less than 24 months apart. The region with the lowest burden was Sub-Saharan Africa, with 20% of births having an interval of less than 24 months.

Birth intervals have been found to be higher in traditional hunter-gatherer societies. The median birth interval of the Gainj people of the New Guinea Highlands has been reported as 3.6 years (43 months), and that of the !Kung people of Africa as 3.7 years (44 months).

== Other animals ==
The inter-birth intervals in wild apes are reported to be significantly longer than those in humans, with median birth intervals at 3.8 years for gorillas, 5.6 years for chimpanzees and 7.7 years for orangutans.

== See also ==
- Weaning
