= Katherine Ann Dettwyler =

American anthropologist

- Born: February 3, 1955 (age 71); United States
- Occupations: Anthropologist, professor

Katherine Ann Dettwyler is an American anthropologist and advocate of breastfeeding. She was an adjunct professor at the University of Delaware. In 2017, she gained media attention for her opinions regarding Otto Warmbier, a 22-year-old college student who received fatal brain damage while imprisoned in North Korea.

== Background and education ==
Katherine Ann Dettwyler was born on February 3, 1955. She earned her BS in Anthropology from the University of California, Davis, in 1977, her MA from Indiana University Bloomington in 1981, and her Ph.D. in Anthropology also from IU Bloomington in 1985.

== Professional career ==
Dettwyler taught as a Visiting Assistant Professor at the Department of Sociology and Anthropology of the University of Southern Mississippi in Hattiesburg, Mississippi from 1985 to 1987. She taught at Texas A&M University, College Station, Texas in the Anthropology department from 1987 until 2000, when she took early retirement from her position as a tenured Associate Professor and moved to Delaware with her husband and children.

Through the 1990s she was a nutritional anthropologist/consultant to a number of organizations providing nutrition education in Mali, while performing field research there. She taught part-time as an Adjunct Associate Professor in the Department of Anthropology at the University of Delaware, and continued to write and speak at conferences and universities. Dettwyler is currently listed in Google Scholar as an "Independent Scholar" who has only been cited in one journal since 2017, for one item in a piece on breastfeeding in Mali (https://scholar.google.com/citations?user=UisWqaUAAAAJ&hl=en). She has no new credits at ResearchGate since 2016.

== Advocacy of breastfeeding ==
Dettwyler is known for her work studying the duration of breastfeeding in humans as it relates to other mammals, principally the nonhuman primates. According to her research, the natural age of weaning is 2½ to 7 years old as determined by weight gain, length of gestation, dental eruption, and other factors.

== Personal life ==
Kathy Dettwyler is married to Steven Dettwyler, Ph.D. in Cultural Anthropology, and the mother of three children. In 1999, she was diagnosed with breast cancer.

== Comments on death of Otto Warmbier ==
In June 2017, Dettwyler's comments on the case of Otto Warmbier attracted media attention. Warmbier was an American college student visiting North Korea who was arrested for allegedly trying to steal a propaganda banner in a staff-only area of his hotel. He was sentenced to 15 years of hard labor, but was released and returned to the United States almost a year and a half later. He was returned in a vegetative state and died a short time after his repatriation.

Dettwyler commented on the case on her personal Facebook page and in the comments section of a National Review article. She said Warmbier was "typical of a mindset of a lot of the young, white, rich, clueless males who come into my classes"; that "these are the same kids who cry about their grades because they didn’t think they’d really have to read and study the material to get a good grade", and that Warmbier's parents "ultimately are to blame for his growing up thinking he could get away with whatever he wanted. Maybe in the US, where young, white, rich, clueless white males routinely get away with raping women. Not so much in North Korea." In a since-deleted post to her Facebook page she asked "is it wrong of me to think that Otto Warmbier got exactly what he deserved?"

Dettwyler had been an adjunct professor at the University of Delaware, without tenure, and was not employed between terms. After her comments became public, the university announced that her contract would not be renewed. Dettwyler stated that her family had received death threats over the controversy, and insinuated that she had other stories regarding questionable behaviours by the students of the university.

== Publications ==
=== Books ===
- Cultural Anthropology & Human Experience: The Feast of Life (2011) ISBN 978-1577666813
- Reflections on Anthropology: A Four-Field Reader (2003) ISBN 0-07-248598-1 – co-editor with Vaughn M. Bryant
- Breastfeeding: Biocultural Perspectives (1995) ISBN 0-202-01192-5 - co-editor with Patricia Stuart-Macadam
- Dancing Skeletons: Life and Death in West Africa (1994) ISBN 978-0-88133-748-8. 1995 Margaret Mead Award from the American Anthropological Association and the Society for Applied Anthropology.

=== Selected academic journal articles ===
- Dettwyler, K. A. (2004). "When to wean: Biological versus cultural perspectives". Clinical Obstetrics and Gynecology. 47 (3): 712–723. doi:10.1097/01.grf.0000137217.97573.01. PMID 15326433.
- Dettwyler, K. A. (1991). "Can paleopathology provide evidence for "compassion"?". American Journal of Physical Anthropology. 84 (4): 375–384. Bibcode:1991AJPA...84..375D. doi:10.1002/ajpa.1330840402. PMID 1828940.
- Dettwyler, K. A. (1989). "Styles of Infant Feeding: Parental/Caretaker Control of Food Consumption in Young Children". American Anthropologist. 91 (3): 696–703. doi:10.1525/aa.1989.91.3.02a00100. JSTOR 680874.
