= Weaning =

Process of abandoning maternal nourishment in mammals

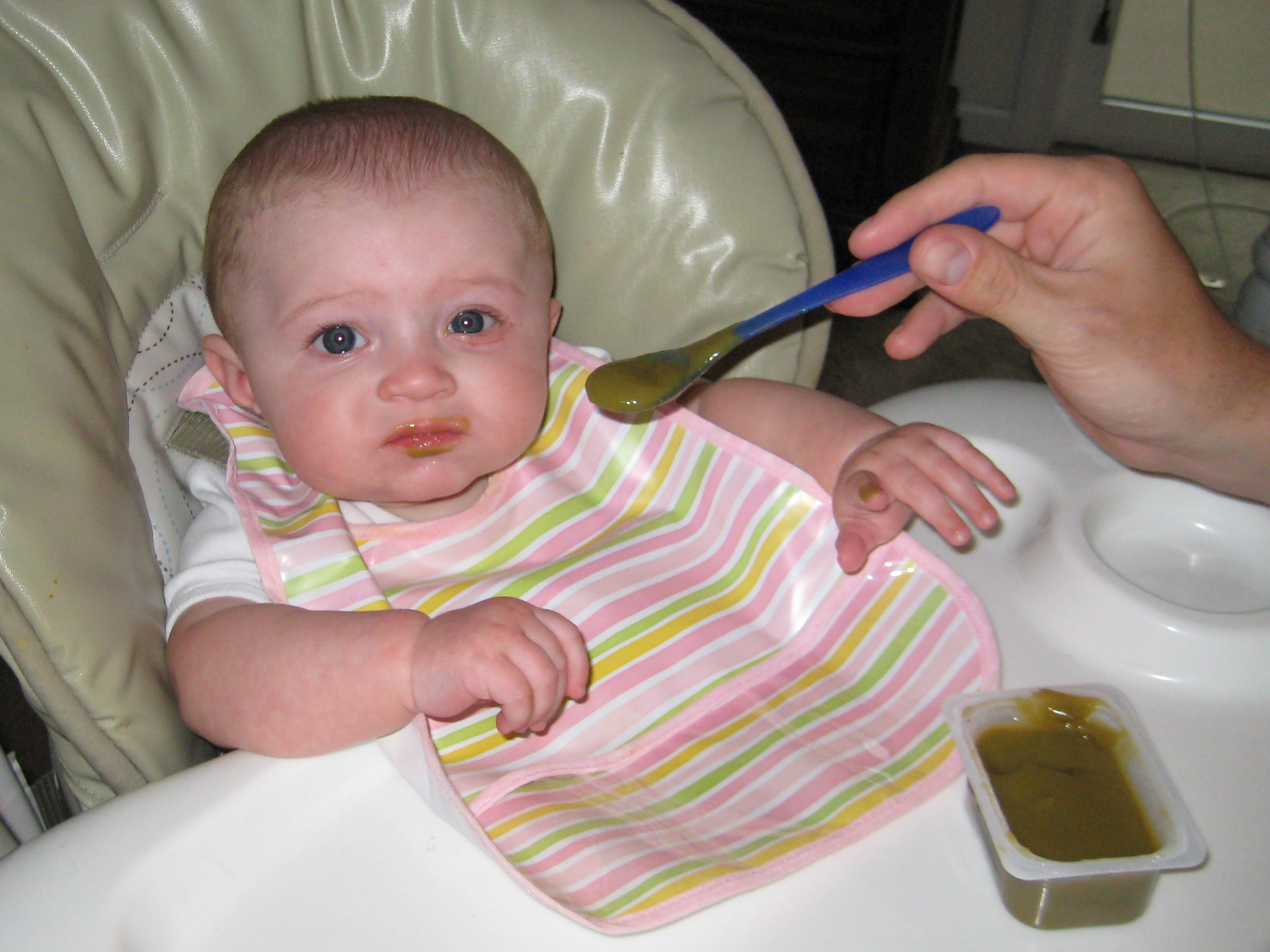
Baby being offered baby food

Weaning is the process of gradually introducing an infant human or other mammal to what will be its adult diet while withdrawing the supply of its mother's milk. In the UK, weaning primarily refers to the introduction of solid foods at 6 months; in the US, it primarily refers to stopping breastfeeding.

The process takes place only in mammals, as only mammals produce milk. The infant is considered to be fully weaned once it is no longer fed by any breast milk (or bottled substitute).

== Humans ==
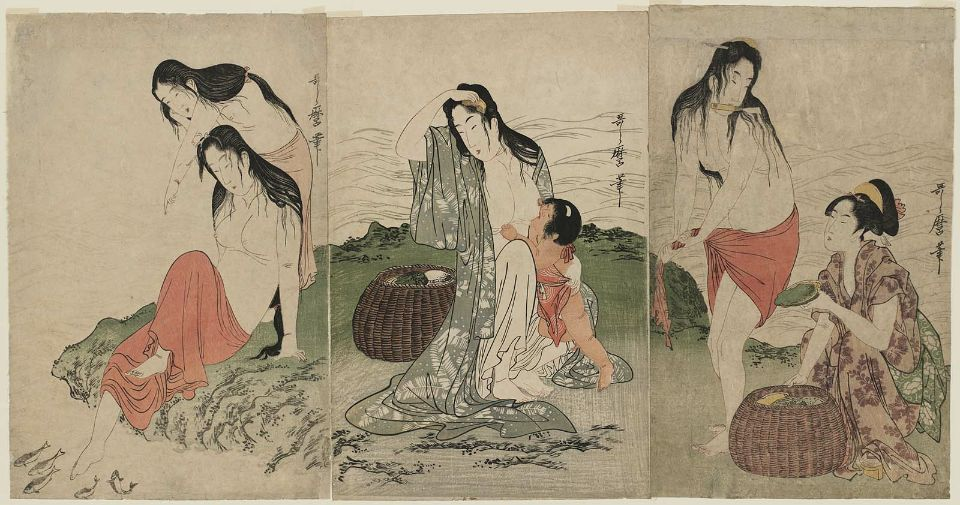
A shellfish diver prepares for her work as a toddler nurses. (Japan, c. 1806)

In some cultures, weaning progresses with the introduction of feeding the child food that has been prechewed by the parent along with continued breastfeeding, a practice known as premastication. The practice was important throughout human history in that it naturally gave a child a greatly improved protein source in addition to preventing iron deficiency. However, premasticated food from caregivers of lower socioeconomic status in areas of endemic diseases can result in the passing of the disease to the child.

How and when to wean a human infant is controversial. The American Academy of Pediatrics recommends feeding a baby only breast milk for the first six months of its life. Many mothers find breastfeeding challenging, especially in countries where many mothers have to return to work relatively soon after the birth of their child.

The American Academy of Pediatrics, the World Health Organization, the National Health Service Choices UK, and the National Health & Medical Research Council in Australia recommend waiting until six months to introduce baby food. In Germany, the recommendations are as follows that complementary foods may be introduced after the completion of the fourth month of life. Introduction should begin between the completion of the fourth and the completion of the sixth month of life. However, many baby food companies market their "stage 1" foods to children between four and six months old with the precaution that the food is meant to be consumed in addition to breast milk or formula and is just for "practice". These practice foods are generally soft and runny. Examples include mashed fruit and vegetables. Certain foods are recommended to be avoided. The United Kingdom's NHS recommends withholding foods including those "that contain wheat, gluten, nuts, peanuts, peanut products, seeds, liver, eggs, fish, shellfish, cows' milk and soft or unpasteurised cheese" until a baby is six months old, as they may cause food allergies or make the baby ill. However, recommendations such as these have been called into question by research that suggests early exposure to potential allergens does not increase the likelihood of allergies, and in some cases reduces it.

Evidence from clinical trials shows that nutrition education of family members about infant weaning practices probably has a positive effect on babies' weight and height at 12 months compared with conventional management of weaning.

No matter what age baby food is introduced, it is generally a very messy affair, as young children do not have the coordination to eat neatly. Coordination for using utensils properly and eating with dexterity takes years to develop. Many babies begin using utensils between 10 and 14 months, but most will not be able to feed themselves sufficiently well until about two or three years of age.

=== Weaning conflict ===
At this point, the mother tries to force the infant to cease nursing, while the infant attempts to force the mother to continue. From an evolutionary perspective, weaning conflict may be considered the result of the cost of continued nursing to the mother, perhaps in terms of reduced ability to raise future offspring, exceeding the benefits to the mother in terms of increased survival of the current infant. This can come about because future offspring will be equally related to the mother as the current infant, but will share less than 100% of the current infant's genes. So, from the perspective of the mother's evolutionary fitness, it makes sense for her to cease nursing the current infant as soon as the cost to future offspring exceeds the benefit to the current infant. But, assuming the current infant shares 50% of the future offspring's genes, from the perspective of the infant's own evolutionary fitness, it makes sense for the infant to continue nursing until the cost to future offspring exceeds twice the benefit to itself (perhaps less, depending on the number of potential future offspring). Weaning conflict has been studied for a variety of mammal species, including primates and canines.

=== Age ===
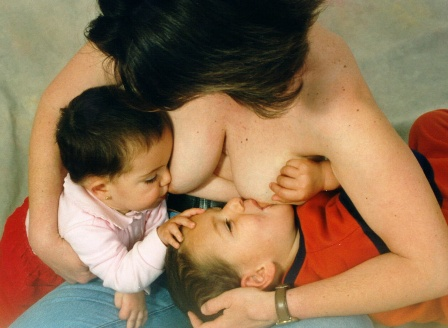
Breastfeeding in tandem

There are significant individual and cultural variations in regards to weaning.

Scientifically, one can ask various questions; some of the most straightforwardly empirical include:

- At what age do children self-wean?
- At what age do various societies normatively choose to wean?
- In comparison with other animals, especially similar primates, by various measures.

As there are significant ranges and skew in these numbers (some infants are never nursed, or only nursed briefly, for instance), looking at the median (half-way mark) is more useful than looking at the average.

Considering biological measures of maturity, notably investigated by Katherine Ann Dettwyler, yields a range of ages from 2 1/2 years to 7 years as the weaning age analogous to other primates – the "natural age of weaning". This depends on the measure, for example: weaning in non-human primates is often associated with eruption of permanent molars (humans: 5 1/2 to 6 years); comparing duration of nursing to length of pregnancy (gestation time) yields a factor of about 6 in chimpanzees and gorillas (humans: 6 × 9 months = 54 months = 4 1/2 years); body weight may be compared to birth weight (quadrupling of birth weight yields about 2 1/2 to 3 1/2 years for humans; 1/3 of adult weight yields 5 to 7 years for humans); and similarly for other measures.

Other studies are possible, as in psychological factors. For example, Barbara Rogoff has noted, citing a 1953 study by Whiting & Child, that the most distressing time to wean a child is at 13–18 months. After this peak, weaning becomes progressively easier and less distressing for the child, with "older children frequently wean[ing] themselves".

In her study of pre-war Japanese society The Chrysanthemum and the Sword, Ruth Benedict documents that Japanese children were usually not weaned until soon before a new sibling arrives. However the government promoted eighth-month weaning which was reluctantly adopted by the middle-class in the benefit of the baby. The factor that the Japanese meals did not include cow's milk or special vegetables for children also favored late weaning.

== Other mammals ==
In science, mice are frequently used in laboratory experiments. When breeding laboratory mice in a controlled environment, the weaning is defined as the moment when the pups are transferred out of the mothers' cage. Weaning is recommended at three to four weeks after parturition.

For pet carnivores such as dogs or cats, there are special puppy or kitten foods commercially available. Alternatively, if the pet owner feeds the parent animals home-made pet food, the young can be fed the same foods chopped into small pieces.

=== Cattle ===
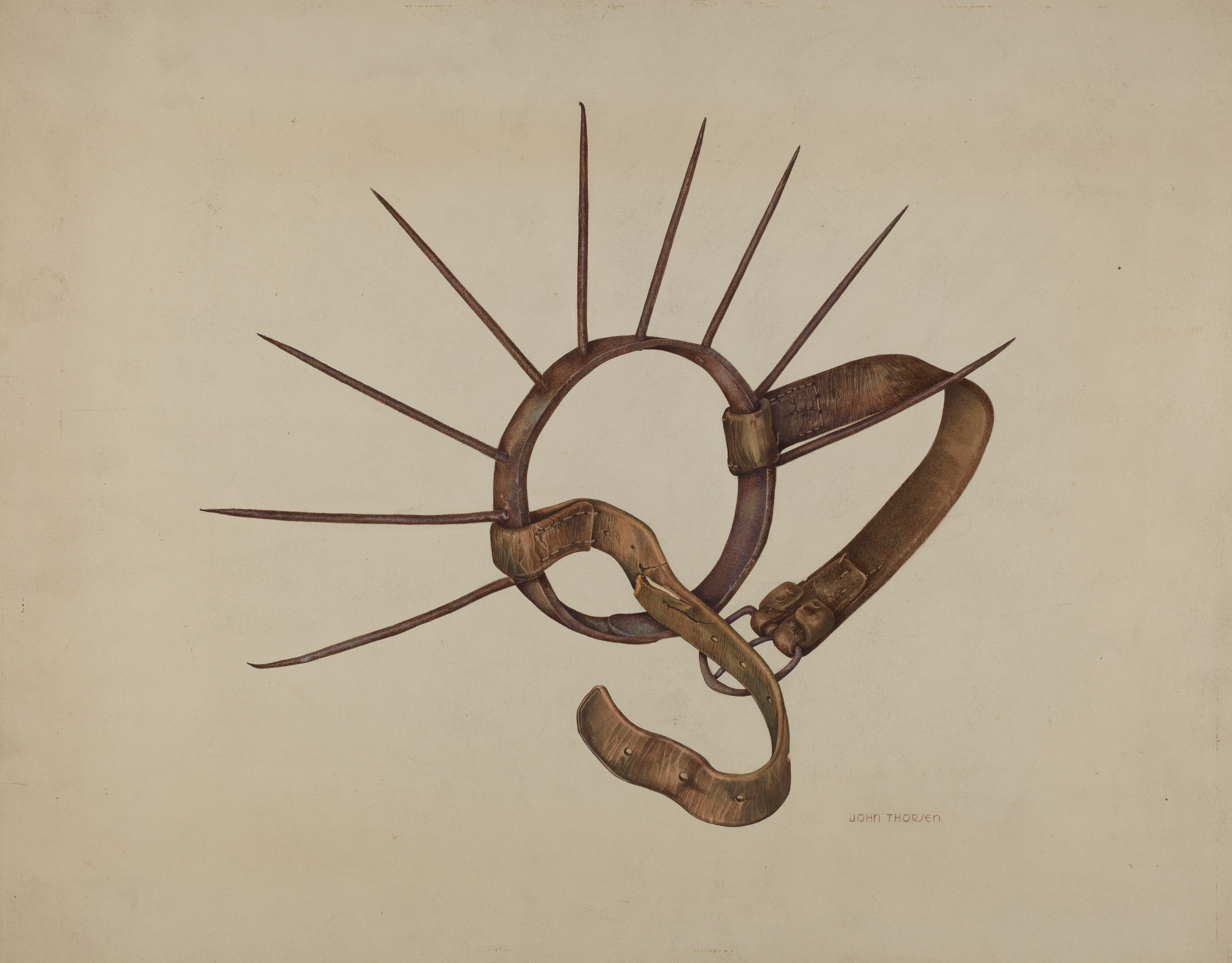
1938 drawing of a calf weaner nose ring. This was strapped to the calf's face and made the calf's attempts to suckle very uncomfortable for the dam.

Weaning in cattle can be done by many methods. Dairy calves in the United States are weaned off their mother at an average of around 7 weeks of age. Beef calves are not usually weaned off their dams until the calves are between 8 and 10 months of age. Before a calf is completely weaned off of milk, for both dairy and beef cattle, the calf must have developed a fully functioning rumen. For beef cattle, there are many methods of weaning that are used. Options include:

- traditional weaning through total separation,
- two-step weaning with the use of a nose ring or other device, and
- fenceline weaning, which physically separates the calf from its dam by a fence.

The use of these methods depends on farm management style, feed availability, condition and age of cow (dam), type of production and whether or not the calves are heifers. Results vary between farms, and methods are still being researched as studies have shown contradicting results on stress levels of calves from different methods of weaning.

Traditionally beef calves are weaned by abrupt separation, where the calves are separated from their dams and have no contact with each other, or by fence line weaning where the dam and calf have contact over a fence line. This has shown to cause high stress in both the dams and the calves. Both the dams and the young express high vocalization, reduced feed intake, reduced rumination, and an increased amount of time searching for each other as well as disrupting the social structure of the herd and of the calves. There is evidence that calves can undergo a form of depression post weaning, and have the potential to undergo illness that may need to be treated.

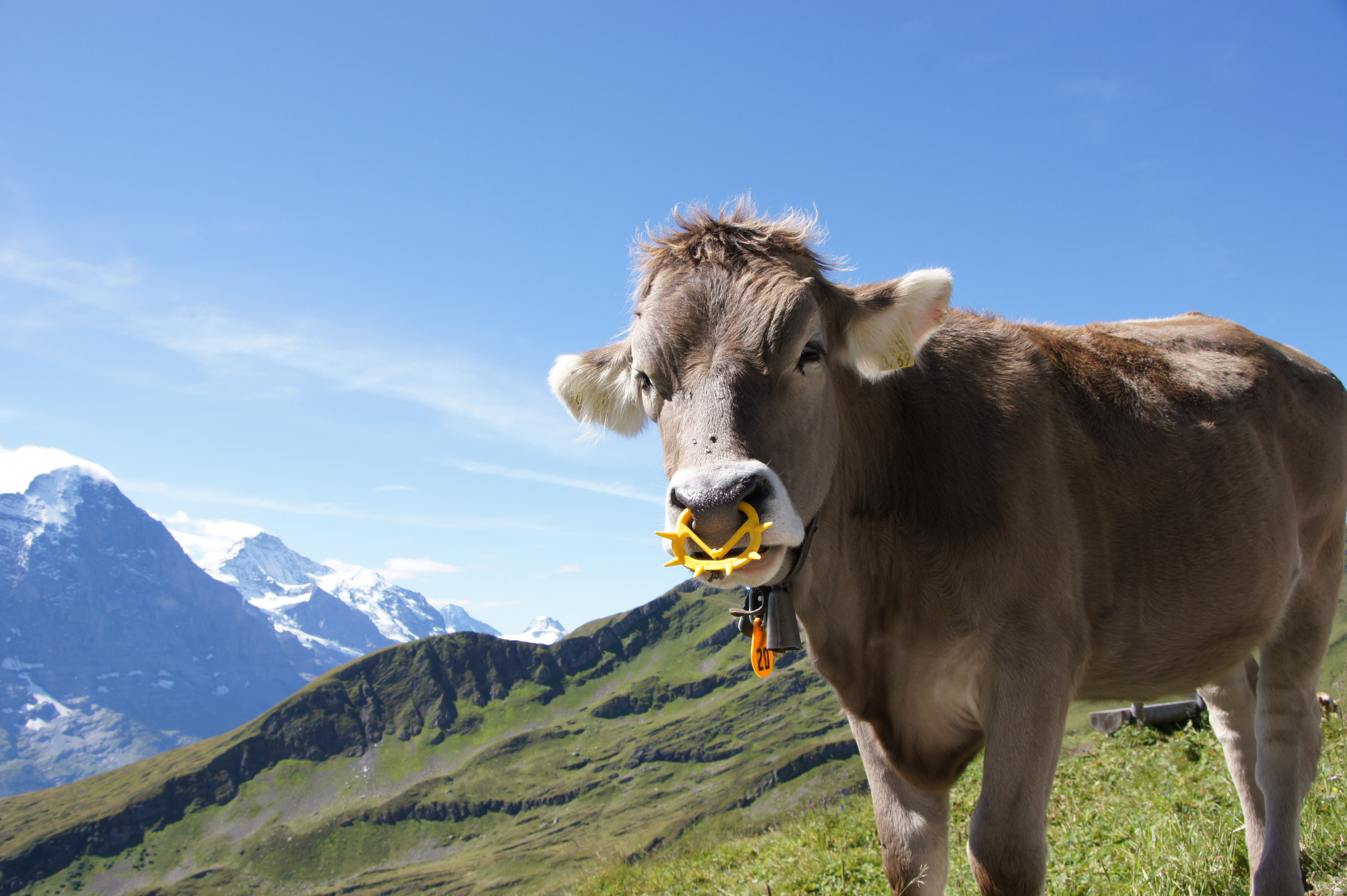
The yellow nose ring prevents the calf from suckling, but does not interfere with grazing or social contact with its dam or other members of the herd.

Two-step weaning is used to wean off beef calves from their dams over the space of a couple of weeks. With this method the calf is fitted with a nose flap that prevents suckling for a period of time, after which the calf is separated from the dam preventing contact. The nose flap does not limit the calf from performing any behaviors other than suckling; they are still able to drink and graze normally. Most research has shown that this method reduces the amount of stress that the calves endure. Studies show that prior to separation there is no change in feeding habits, social interaction to other members of the herd. Once the nose flap is removed and the calves are separated from the dams, there has been data showing less vocalization, less pacing and spent more time eating than calves that were weaned on a more traditional method.

Dairy calves are separated from their dam soon after they are born in most dairy operations. In some there is no contact between calf and cow for claimed health related reasons, such as preventing bovine paratuberculosis (Johne's disease). However, one review found that changing the time of separation did not consistently improve overall cow or calf health. The main purpose of separating dairy cows from their calves to allow collection and selling of milk. The calves are then fed colostrum from the dam for the first few days, and then milk replacer. Dairy calves do not have ab libitum milk like beef calves. By limiting the amount of milk the calves receive it caused the calves to consume more feed which leads to faster development of the rumen. Dairy calves are usually weaned off milk early, usually at 4 to 8 weeks of age.

=== Horses ===
Weaning in horses usually takes place when the foal is 4 to 5 months old, as by this point the foal no longer needs nutrients beyond what the mare offers. Prior to weaning the foal, there is usually a creep feeder set up to allow the foal to begin consuming feed that the mare cannot access. There are two main approaches to weaning foals, abrupt and gradual weaning. Abrupt weaning is when the mare and foal are separated, usually without contact. Gradual weaning consists of the separating the mare and foal, but still with contact, but not enough contact that allows nursing to occur, and then after a period of time the mare and foal are separated not allowing contact, or, in some cases, sight of each other. Foals that are weaned by the abrupt method have shown to have higher stressful behaviors displayed. Weaning foals in groups for both methods can reduce stress in the foals.

Early separation is defined as separating foals from their mothers before 4 months of age. Advocates of early separation suggest this benefits mares and foals because a mare's milk production decreases dramatically by the third month of lactation, and the nutritional needs of the foal cannot be met by maternal milk supply alone. Thus, early weaning facilitates management of the foal's nutritional intake. Mare reproductive efficiency can be optimized by limiting the potential negative effect of prolonged nursing. Research indicates that the later-weaned foals catch up by one year of age and subsequent differences are negligible.

==== Group pasture weaning ====
This method of separation involves removing mares from the pasture and taking them to a distant paddock where they cannot see or hear their foals. This method reduces stress by allowing mares and foals to remain with their companions.

==== Barn weaning ====
This method of separation involves removing a mare and her foal from the pasture and taking them to the barn, then taking the mare out of the stall and to a distant paddock, leaving her foal behind. After a period of days or weeks, the foal is returned to the pasture.

=== Pigs ===
Sow-piglet separation is the practice of separating piglets from their mothers to wean them. It is used both in meat production and in breeding miniature pigs as pets.

In farmed pigs, sows reach maturity and are first bred between 170 to 220 days of age. Gestation crates, teeth clipping, and tail docking are commonly used in intensive pig farming with the claim of reducing deaths of piglets that haven't reached market weight. Research does not support these claims. Piglets are separated from their mothers between 3-4 weeks of age in intensive farming and 6-8 weeks of age in organic or small-scale farming and subsequently moved to pens. Male piglets are typically sent to slaughter when they reach six months of age. Female piglets are typically raised to become breeding sows. Once a sow is no longer fertile, she is sent to slaughter.

In pet pigs, sows reach maturity are first bred between 12-16 weeks of age. Sows are closely monitored giving birth to their first litter, and may be sedated to prevent them from crushing, laying on, or cannibalizing their piglets. Piglets are typically separated from their mothers within 6-8 weeks of age to be sold as pets. Female piglets with 8-12 teats may be raised to become breeding sows. If the breeder chooses to use natural breeding methods, a male piglet may be raised to become a breeding boar. Breeding sows may be sold as pets when they are no longer fertile, or kept as pets by their original owner.

Separating piglets from the sow involves different trade-offs depending on timing. Early separation (<4 weeks) helps reduce disease transmission and allows the sow to rebreed faster, but compromises piglet health. Late separation (6–8 weeks or later) results in healthier, heavier piglets, but stresses the sow and limits farm productivity.

=== Dogs ===
With dogs the puppies are slowly weaned off their mother, slowly reducing the amount of milk and care that the mother is giving to them. It generally is started when the puppies are 3–4 weeks old, and usually continues until they are 7–8 weeks old. By weaning the puppies slowly, it allows the mothers milk to dry up at a slow pace, making it less stressful for the mother.

Naturally, in the wild, the mother will begin weaning off the puppies because the puppies will start developing teeth which will irritate the mother when the puppies are suckling. This causes her to continually leave the puppies for longer periods of time, causing them to gradually be weaned off their mother. Wild dogs will also regurgitate food to transition the puppies to a new diet.

During this weaning process the puppies will learn from their litter-mates, and from their mother certain behaviors such as understanding dominance, and learning to reduce their biting habit and when to be submissive to others.

While weaning the puppies should be fed a high quality diet that will be fed to them as they grow post weaning. It may be helpful to moisten the food with water or milk replacer for the first while. By feeding the puppies this it causes the puppies to reduce how much they rely on their mother for food.

=== Rats ===
Rats that are raised in a laboratory, or are bred for selling purposes, are usually weaned at the age of 3 weeks. If the pups were left with their mother then weaning would not occur until they were older. This can have some health and behavioral benefits in the rats. The main reason that pups are weaned at 3 weeks of age is because often the mother is pregnant again, especially in a laboratory setting or if owned by a rat breeder, and therefore the pups must be weaned off the mother before the next litter is born. By doing this it will prevent trampling of the pups, as well as over crowding, which can easily occur, especially if the mother is being kept in a monogamous pairs. Generally the pups are separated by sex when weaning occurs, but are never housed alone. After weaning has begun, the pups should be fed a supplemented diet for at least a month, but can be done up to 13 weeks.

=== Cats ===
Weaning kittens involves transitioning the kittens from mother's milk to solid food. During weaning kittens gradually progress from dependence on a mother's care to social independence. Ideally, weaning is handled entirely by the mother cat. However, if the kitten, for instance, is separated from its mother weaning may have to be done by someone.

Twenty-four hours after birth, kittens can discriminate between their mother's teat and a foreign teat. Studies indicate that kittens have different preferences when being weaned and this is based on specific prenatal and postnatal exposure to various flavours. For example, kittens exposed to cheese flavor during pregnancy and the first week after birth oriented preferentially toward cheese-flavored chicken. The weaning process normally begins when kittens are around four weeks old, and is usually completed when they reach 8–10 weeks. It is important to remember that abrupt removal from the mother cat can have a negative effect on the kitten's health and socialization skills. Weaning kittens should not be done when the kittens are less than 4 weeks old. Once old enough, they should be placed in a separate area for a few hours at a time to reduce their dependence on the mother's milk and her overall presence. The kittens should be put in their own special area with a litter box, food and water bowls.

== See also ==
- Baby-led weaning
- Extended breastfeeding
- Birth spacing
- Cow-calf separation
- Segregated early weaning
