= Cattle cycle =

The cattle cycle is the approximately 10-year period in which the number of U.S. beef cattle is alternatively expanded and reduced over several consecutive years in response to perceived changes in profitability by producers.

Generally, low prices occur when cattle numbers (or beef supplies) are high, precipitating several years of herd liquidation. As cattle numbers decline, prices gradually begin to rise, causing producers to begin adding cattle to their herds. The cycle is relatively long due to the long period of time it takes between the time a cow-calf operator decides to expand a cow herd to breed more beef cattle and the time those animals reach slaughter weight.

== See also ==
- Pork cycle
