= Bull =

Adult male cattle

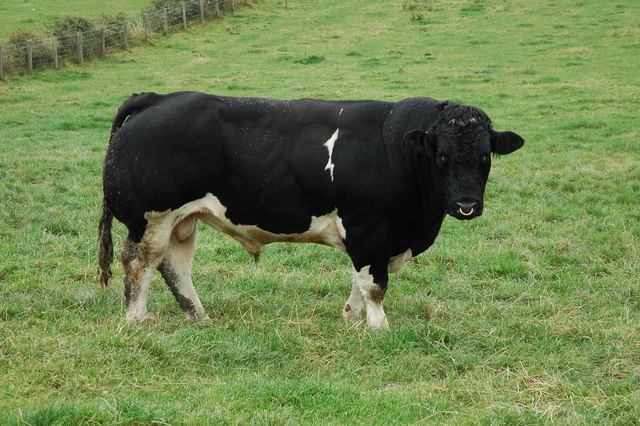
A Holstein Friesian bull

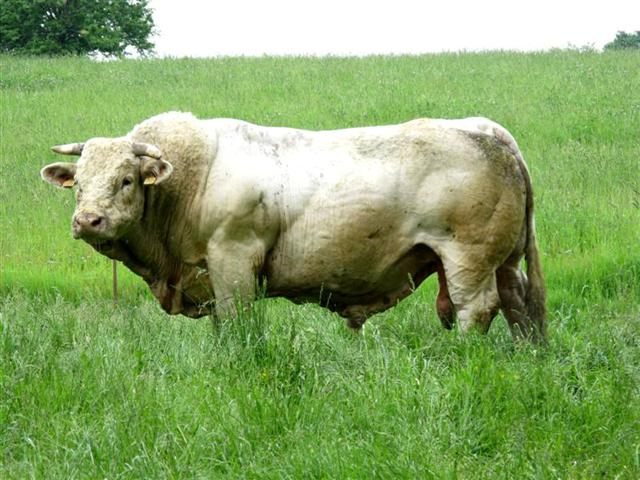
A Charolais bull

A bull is an intact (i.e., not castrated) adult male of the species Bos taurus (cattle). More muscular and aggressive than the females of the same species (i.e. cows proper), bulls have long been an important symbol in many religions, including for sacrifices. These animals play a significant role in beef ranching, dairy farming, and a variety of sporting and cultural activities, including bullfighting and bull riding.

== Nomenclature ==
The female counterpart to a bull is a cow, while a male of the species that has been castrated is a steer, ox, or bullock. Use of these terms varies considerably with area and dialect. Colloquially, people unfamiliar with cattle may also refer to steers and heifers as "cows", and bovines of aggressive or long-horned breeds as "bulls" regardless of sex.

A wild, young, unmarked bull is known as a micky in Australia. Improper or late castration on a bull results in him becoming a coarse steer, also known as a stag in Australia, Canada, and New Zealand. In some countries, an incompletely castrated male is known also as a rig or ridgling.

The word "bull" also denotes the males of other bovines, including bison, yaks, and water buffalo, as well as many other species of large animals, including elephants, rhinos, seals and walruses, hippos, camels, giraffes, elk, moose, whales, dolphins, antelopes, alligators and crocodiles.

== Characteristics ==
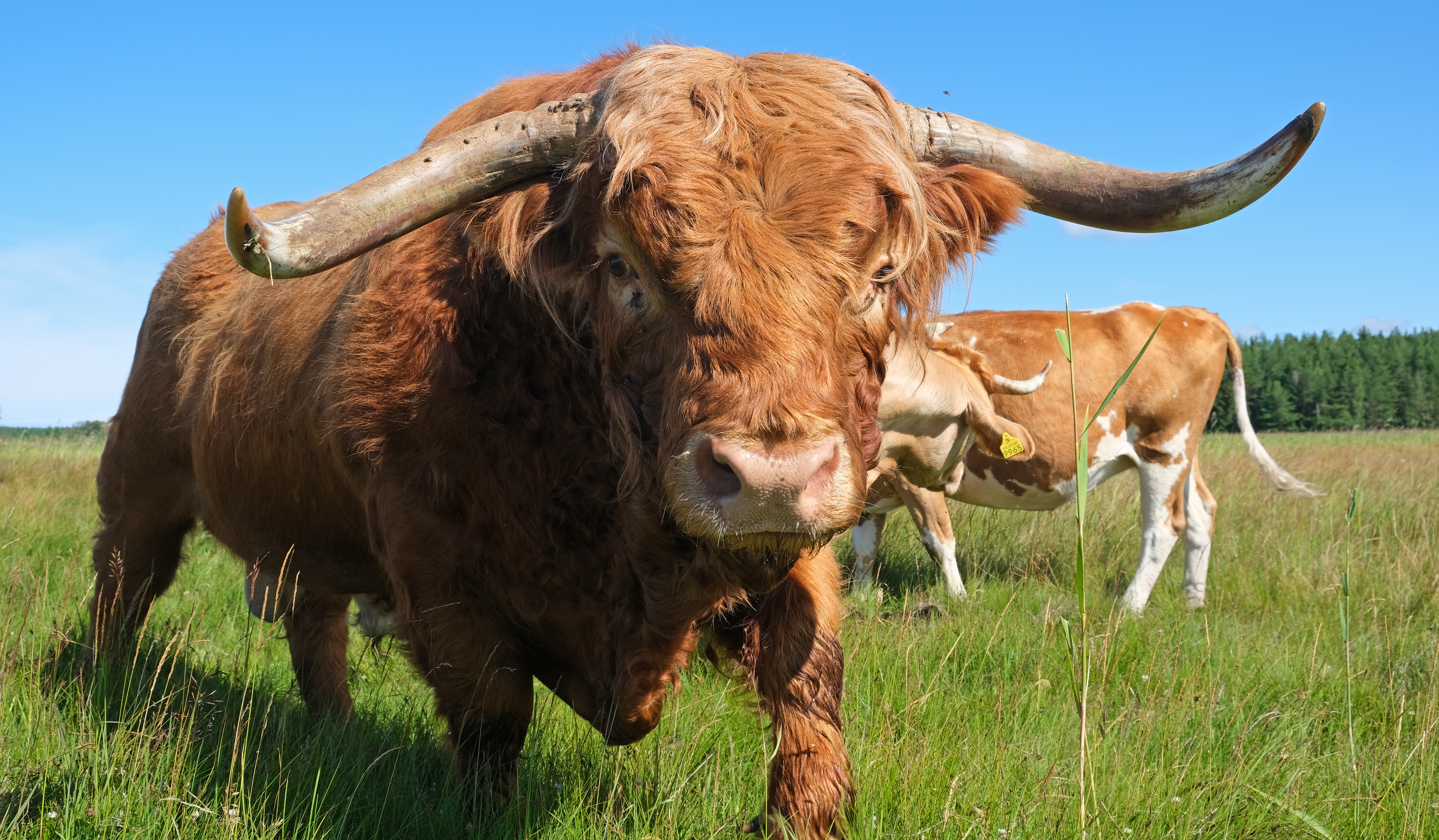
A Scottish Highland bull

Bulls are much more muscular than cows, with thicker bones, larger feet, a very muscular neck, and a large, bony head with protective ridges over the eyes. These features assist bulls in fighting for domination over a herd, giving the winner superior access to cows for reproduction. The hair is generally shorter on the body, but the neck and head often have a "mane" of curlier, woolly hair. Bulls are usually about the same height as cows or a little taller, but because of the additional muscle and bone mass, they often weigh far more. Most of the time, a bull has a hump on his shoulders.

In horned cattle, the horns of bulls tend to be thicker and somewhat shorter than those of cows, and in many breeds, they curve outwards in a flat arc rather than upwards in a lyre shape. It is not true, as is commonly believed, that bulls have horns and cows do not: the presence of horns depends on the breed, or in horned breeds on whether the horns have been disbudded. (It is true, however, that in many breeds of sheep only the males have horns.) Cattle that naturally do not have horns are referred to as polled, or muleys.

Castrated male cattle are physically similar to females in build and horn shape, although if allowed to reach maturity, they may be considerably taller than either bulls or cows, with heavily muscled shoulders and necks.

=== Reproductive anatomy ===
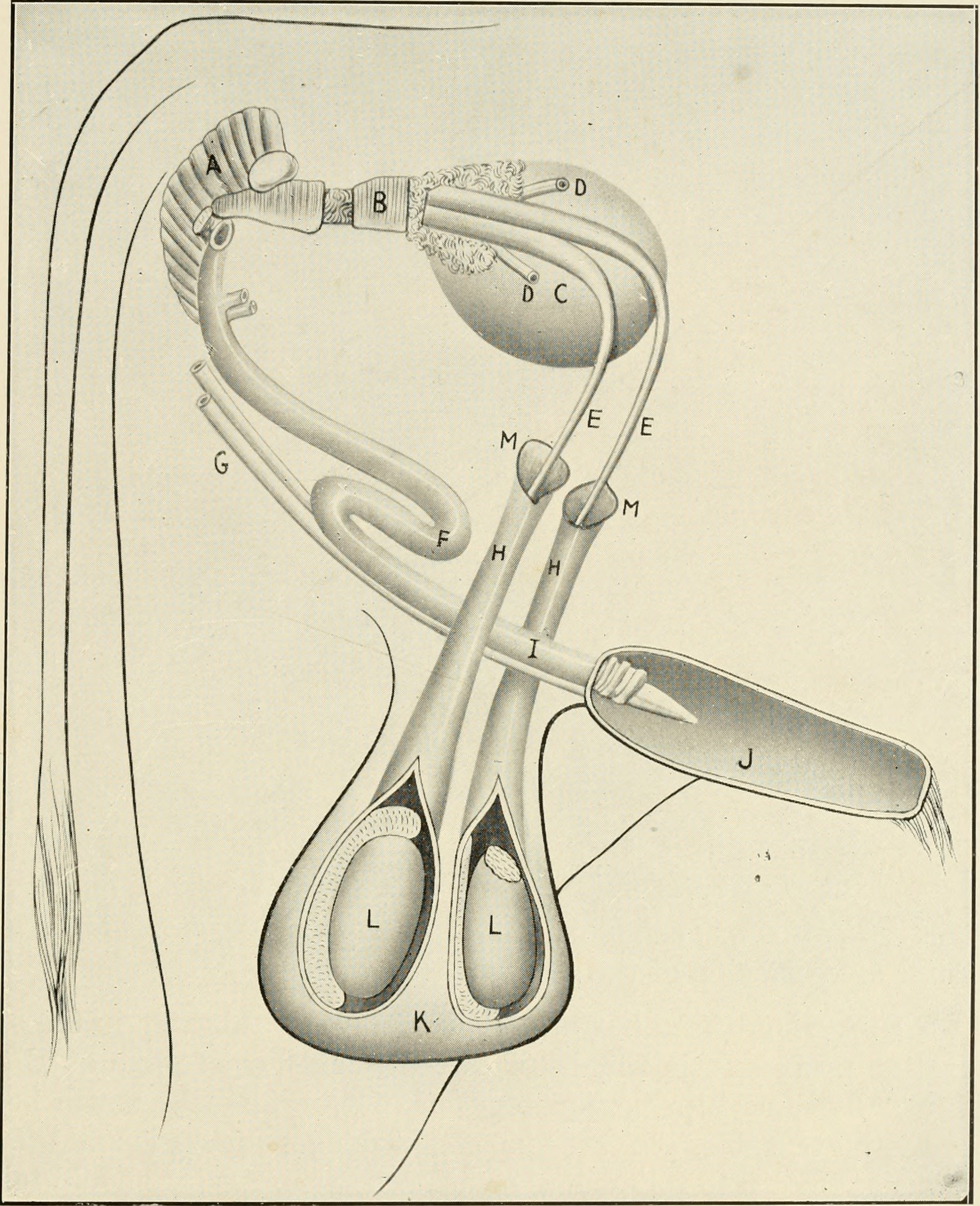
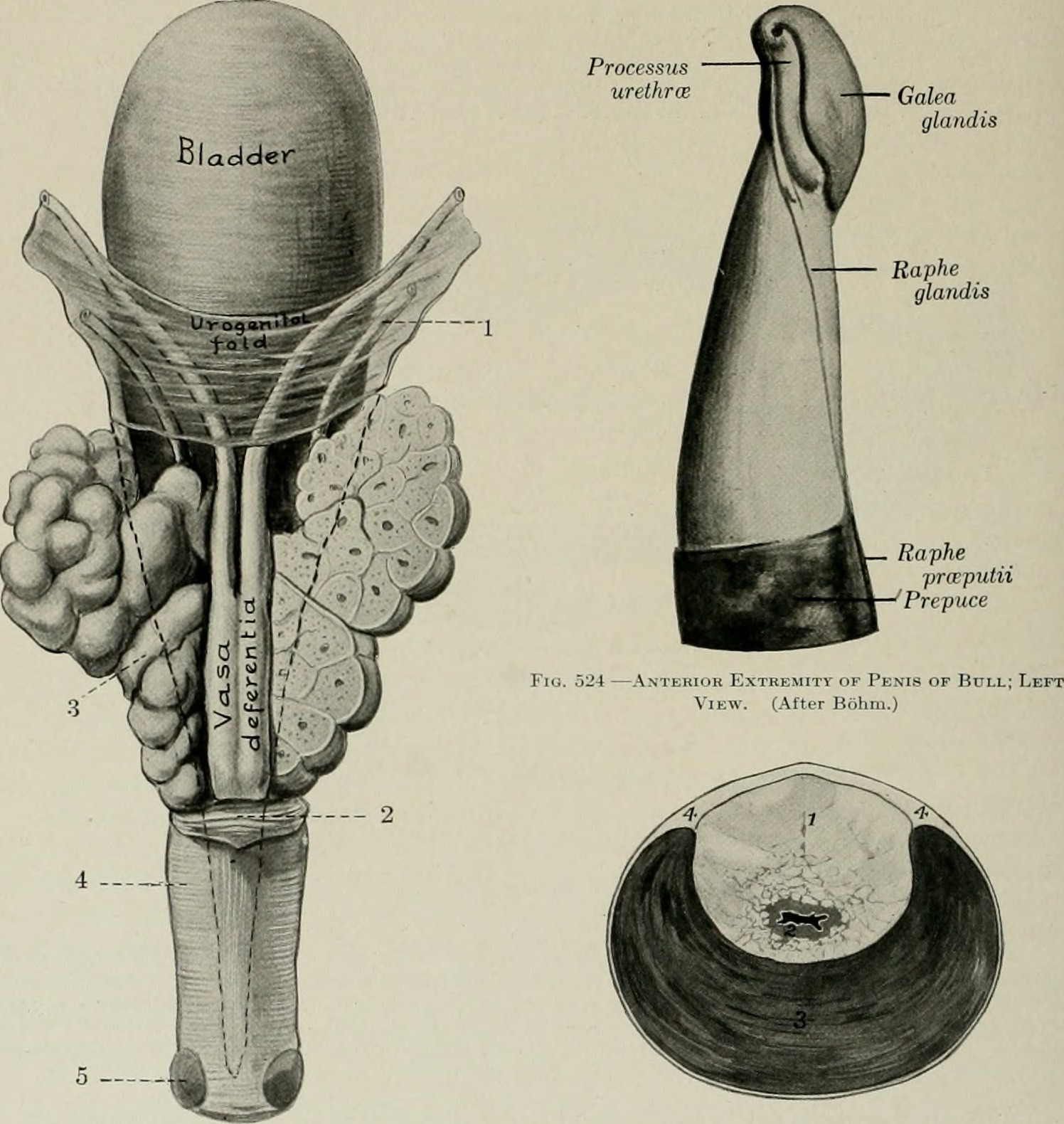
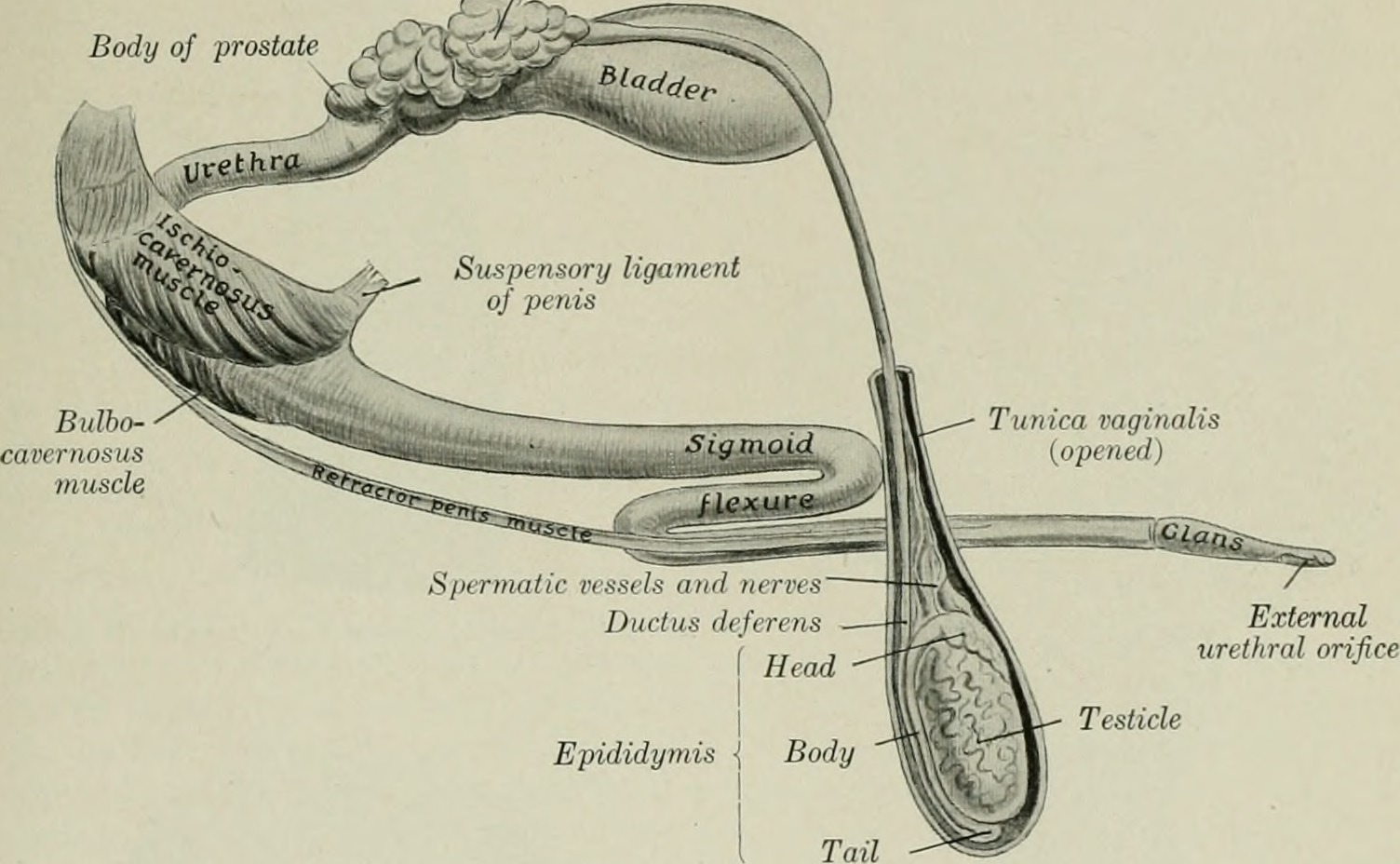
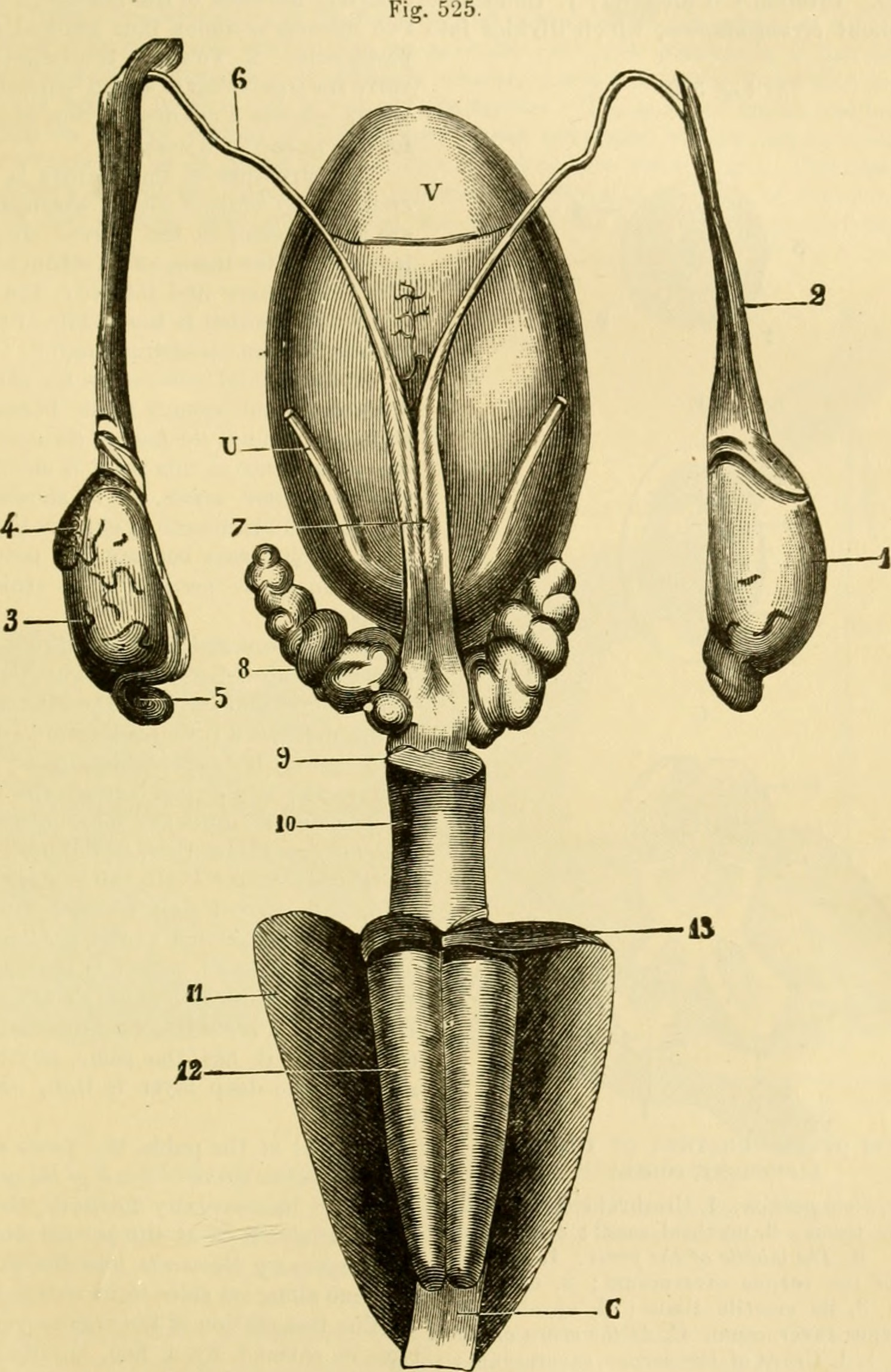
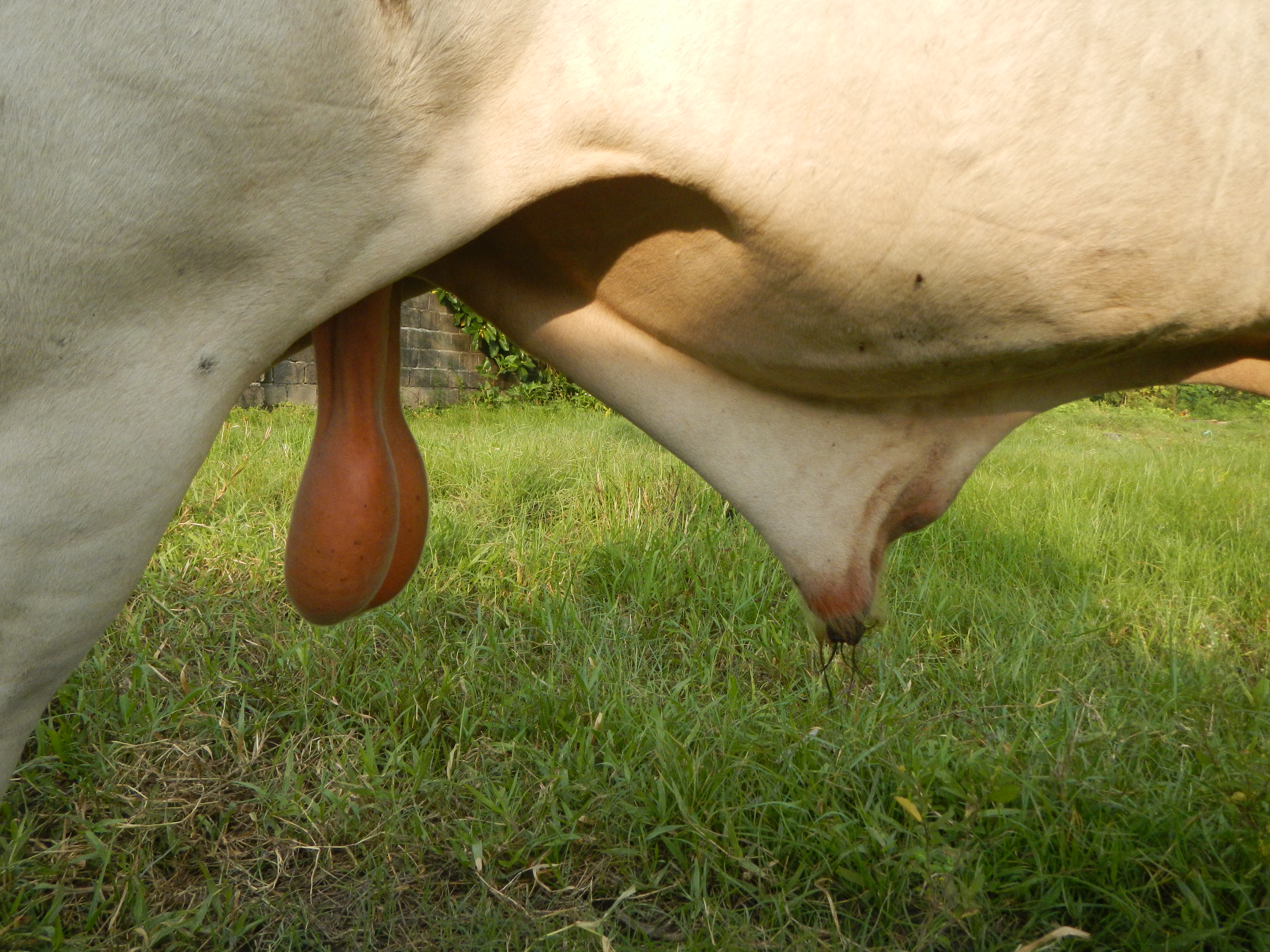
Genitourinary system of the bull

Bulls become fertile around seven months of age. Their fertility is closely related to the size of their testicles, and one simple test of fertility is to measure the circumference of the scrotum; a young bull is likely to be fertile once this reaches 28 centimetres (11 in); that of a fully adult bull may be over 40 centimetres (16 in). Bulls have a fibroelastic penis. Given the small amount of erectile tissue, little enlargement occurs after erection. The penis is quite rigid when not erect, and becomes even more rigid during erection. Protrusion is not affected much by erection, but more by relaxation of the retractor penis muscle and straightening of the sigmoid flexure. Bulls are occasionally affected by a condition known as "corkscrew penis". The penis of a mature bull is about 3–4 cm (1 1/4–1 1/2 inches) in diameter, and 80–100 cm (30–40 inches) in length. The bull's glans penis has a rounded and elongated shape.

=== Misconceptions ===
A common misconception widely repeated in depictions of bull behavior is that the colour red angers bulls, inciting them to charge. In fact, like most mammals, cattle are red–green colour blind. In bull-fighting, the movement of the matador's cape, and not the colour, provokes a reaction in the bull.

== Management ==
=== Beef production ===
Other than the few bulls needed for breeding, the vast majority of male cattle are castrated and slaughtered for meat before the age of three years, except where they are needed (castrated) as work oxen for haulage or used for guard animals. Most of these beef animals are castrated as calves to reduce aggressive behavior and prevent unwanted mating, although some are reared as uncastrated bull beef. A bull is typically ready for slaughter one or two months sooner than a castrated male or a female, and produces proportionately more and leaner muscle.

Frame score is a useful way of describing the skeletal size of bulls and other cattle. Frame scores can be used as an aid to predict mature cattle sizes and aid in the selection of beef bulls. They are calculated from hip height and age. In sales catalogues, this measurement is frequently reported in addition to weight and other performance data such as estimated breed value.

=== Temperament and handling ===
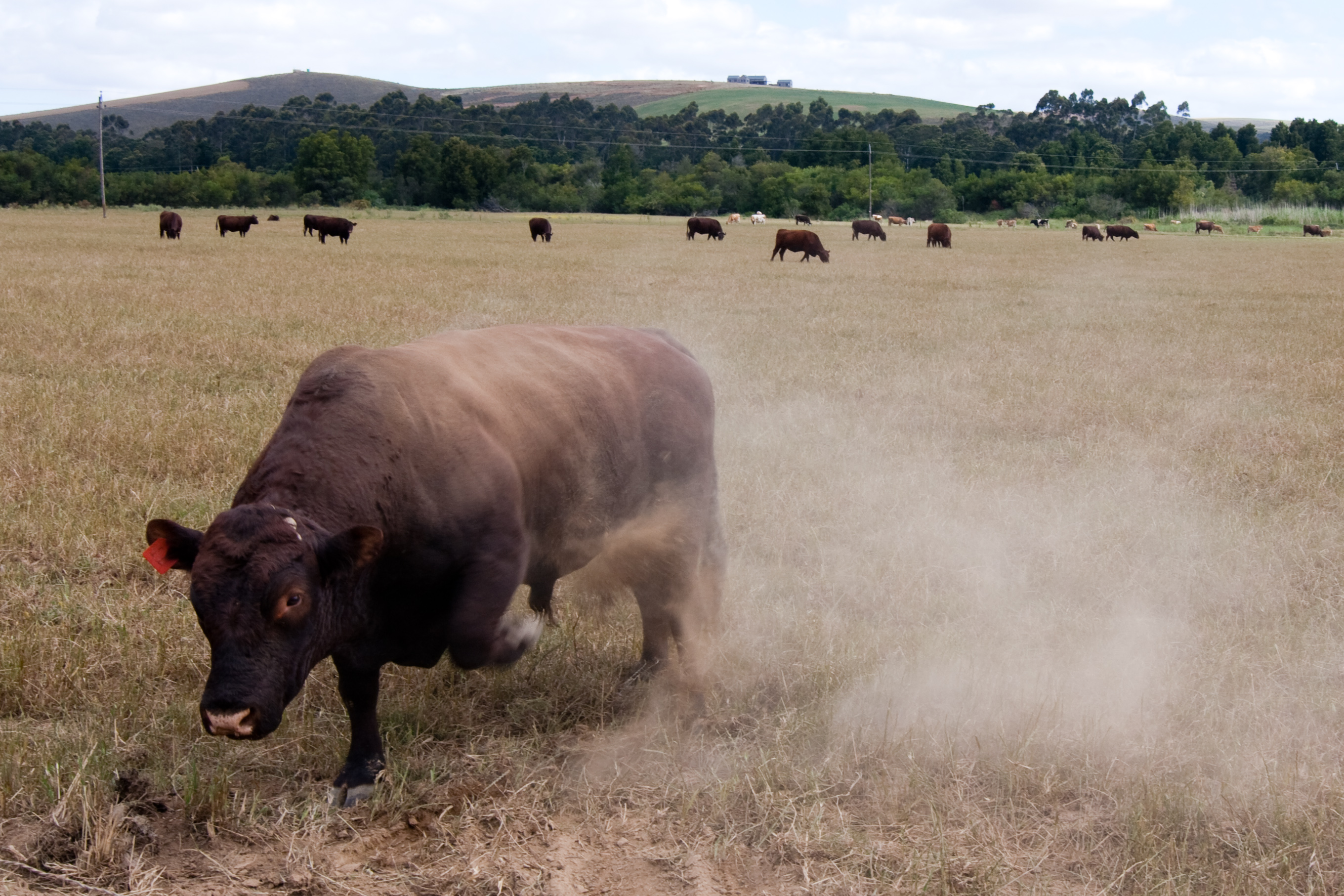
A bull paws up dust in a threat display.

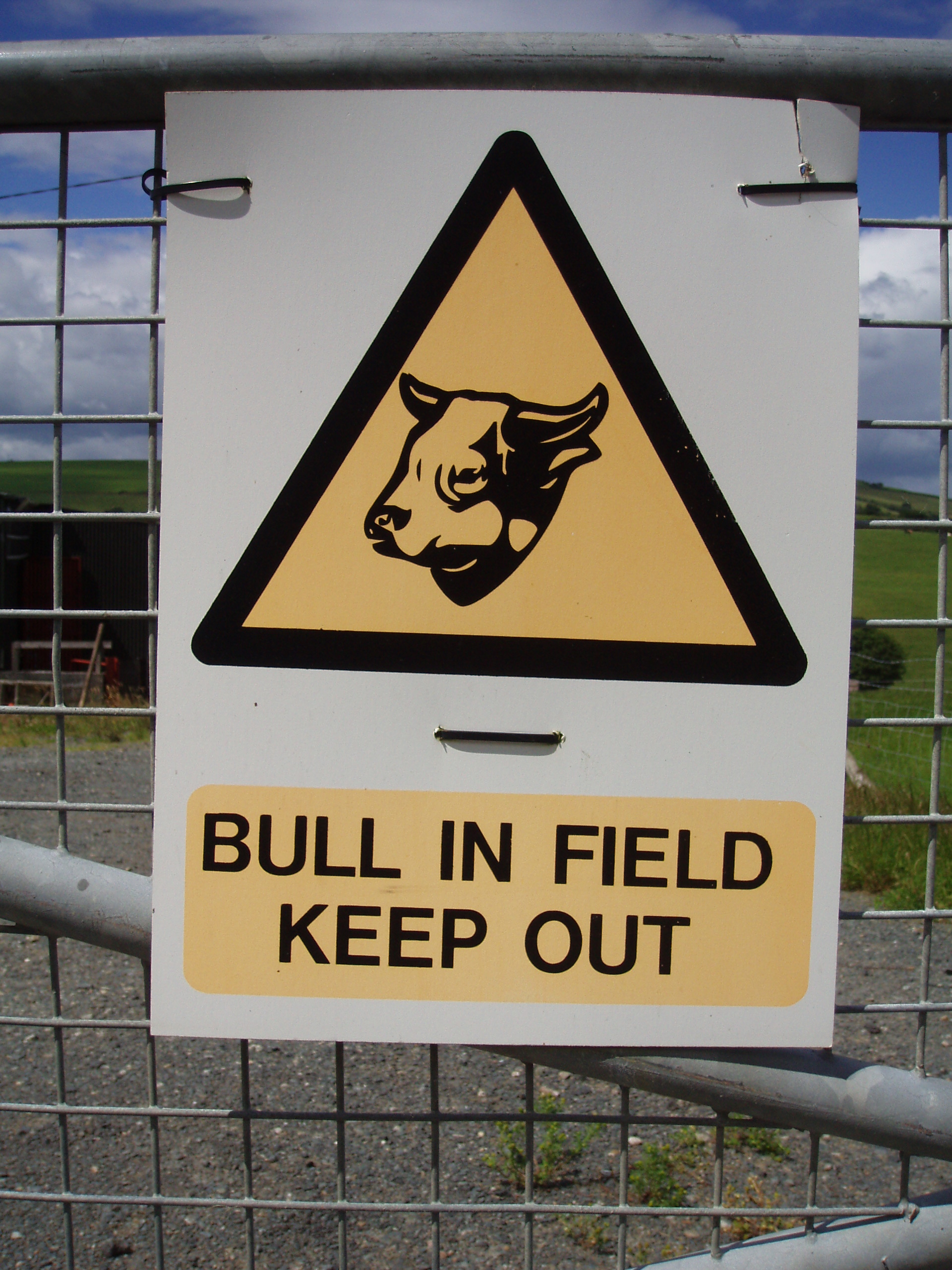
A warning sign for a bull-occupied field.

Adult bulls may weigh between 500 and 1,000 kg (1,100 and 2,200 lb). Most are capable of aggressive behavior and require careful handling to ensure the safety of humans and other animals. Those of dairy breeds may be more prone to aggression, while beef breeds are somewhat less aggressive, though beef breeds such as the Spanish Fighting Bull and related animals are also noted for aggressive tendencies, which are further encouraged by selective breeding.

An estimated 42% of all livestock-related fatalities in Canada are a result of bull attacks. Dairy breed bulls are particularly dangerous and unpredictable; the hazards of bull handling are a significant cause of injury and death for dairy farmers in some parts of the United States. The need to move a bull in and out of its pen to cover cows exposes the handler to serious jeopardy of life and limb. Being trampled, jammed against a wall, or gored by a bull was one of the most frequent causes of death in the dairy industry before 1940. With regard to such risks, one popular farming magazine has suggested, "Handle the bull with a staff and take no chances. The gentle bull, not the vicious one, most often kills or maims his keeper".

=== Handling ===
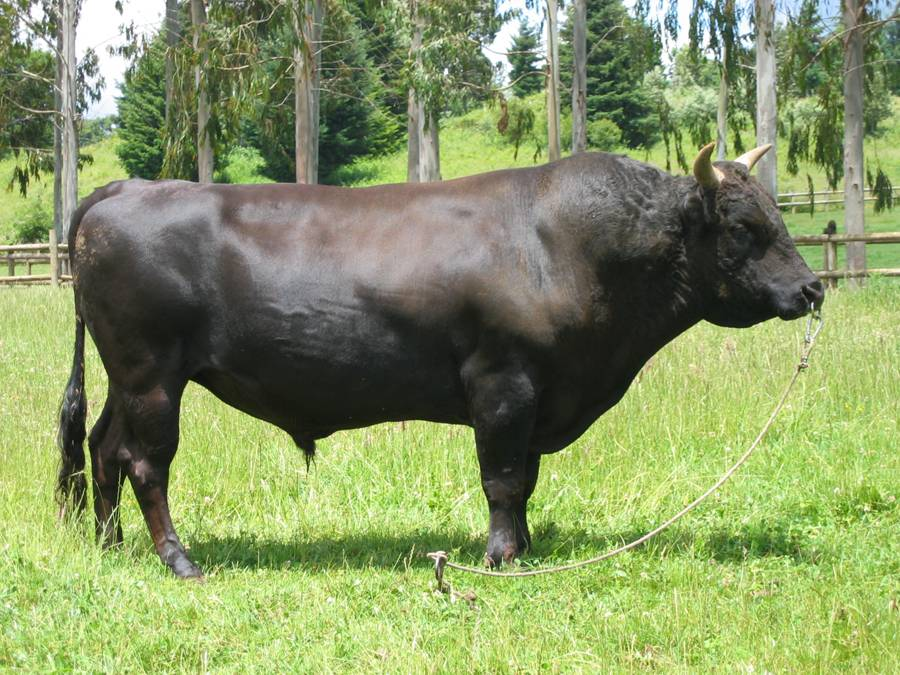
A bull with a nose ring that tethers him to a picket

In many areas, placing rings in bulls' noses to help control them is traditional. The ring is usually made of copper, and is inserted through a small hole cut in the septum of the nose. It is used by attaching a lead rope either directly to it or running through it from a head collar, or for more difficult bulls, a bull pole (or bull staff) may be used. This is a rigid pole about 1 m (3 ft) long with a clip at one end; this attaches to the ring and allows the bull both to be led and to be held away from his handler.

An aggressive bull may be kept confined in a bull pen, a robustly constructed shelter and pen, often with an arrangement to allow the bull to be fed without entering the pen. If an aggressive bull is allowed to graze outside, additional precautions may be needed to help avoid him harming people. One method is a bull mask, which either covers the bull's eyes completely, or restricts his vision to the ground immediately in front of him, so he cannot see his potential victim. Another method is to attach a length of chain to the bull's nose-ring, so that if he ducks his head to charge, he steps on the chain and is brought up short. Alternatively, the bull may be hobbled, or chained by his ring or by a collar to a solid object such as a ring fixed into the ground.

In larger pastures, particularly where a bull is kept with other cattle, the animals may simply be fed from a pickup truck or tractor, the vehicle itself providing some protection for the humans involved. Generally, bulls kept with cows tend to be less aggressive than those kept alone. In herd situations, cows with young calves are often more dangerous to humans. In the off season, multiple bulls may be kept together in a "bachelor herd".

=== Artificial insemination ===
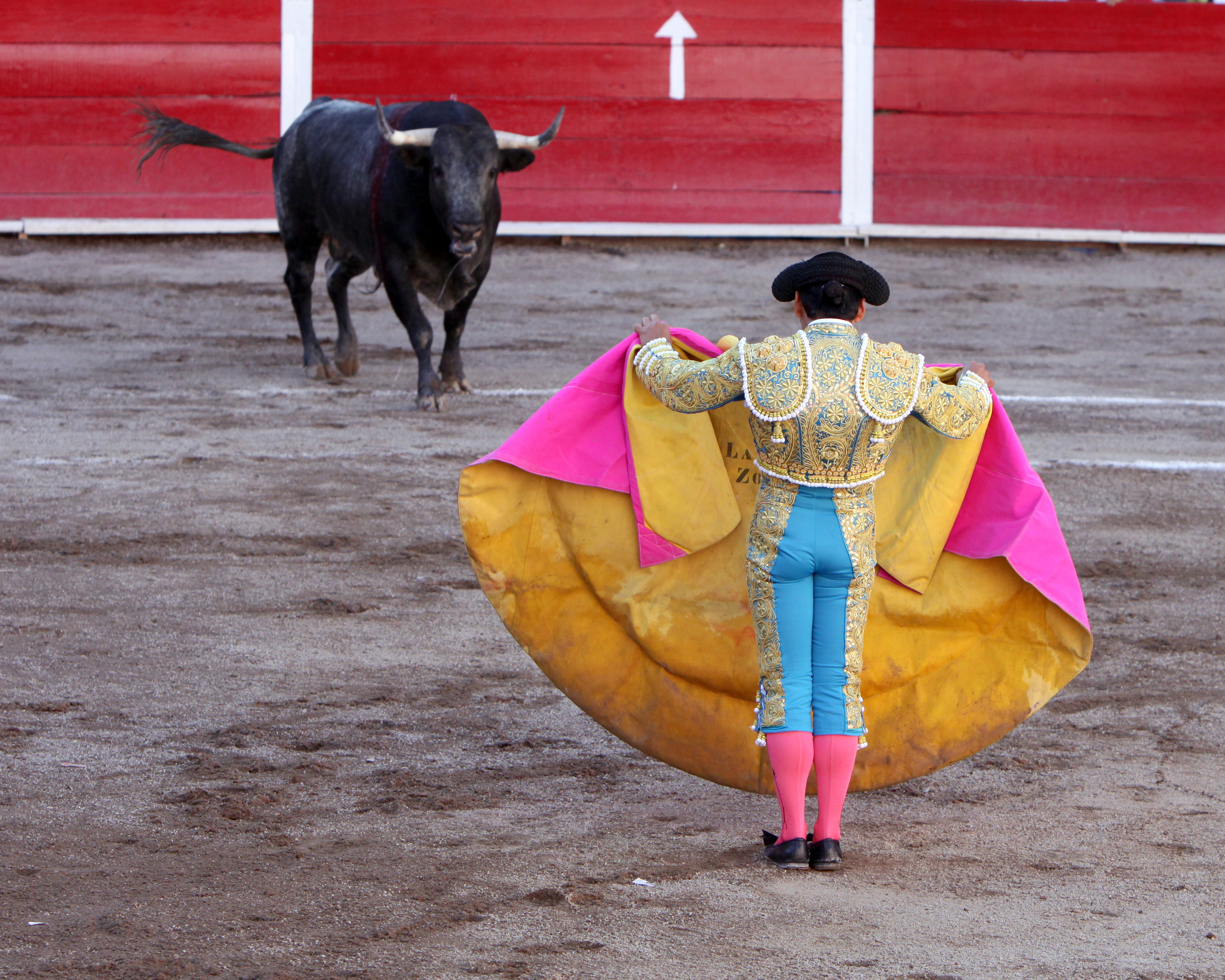
Bullfighting in San Marcos

Many cattle ranches and stations run bulls with cows, and most dairy or beef farms traditionally had at least one, if not several, bulls for purposes of herd maintenance. However, the problems associated with handling a bull (particularly where cows must be removed from his presence to be worked) has prompted many dairy farmers to restrict themselves to artificial insemination (AI) of the cows. Semen is removed from the bulls and stored in canisters of liquid nitrogen, where it is kept until it can be sold, at which time it can be very profitable; in fact, many ranchers keep bulls specifically for this purpose. AI is also used to improve the quality of a herd, or to introduce an outcross of bloodlines. Some ranchers prefer to use AI to allow them to breed to several different bulls in a season or to breed their best stock to a higher-quality bull than they could afford to purchase outright. AI may also be used in conjunction with embryo transfer to allow cattle producers to add new breeding to their herds.

== Relationship with humans ==
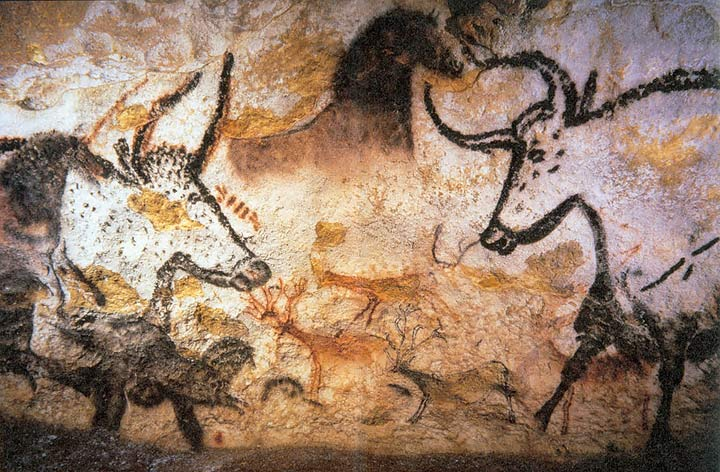
An aurochs bull in a cave painting in Lascaux, France

A bull used in heraldry: Coat of arms of Mecklenburg region, Germany.

Aside from their reproductive duties, bulls are also used in certain sports, including bullfighting and bull-riding. They are also incorporated into festivals and folk events such as the Running of the Bulls and were seen in ancient sports such as bull-leaping. Though less common than castrated males, bulls are used as draught oxen in some areas. The once-popular sport of bull-baiting, in which a bull is attacked by specially bred and trained dogs (which came to be known as bulldogs), was banned in England by the Cruelty to Animals Act 1835.

As with other animals, some bulls have been regarded as pets. The singer Charo, for instance, has owned a pet bull named Manolo.

== Significance in human culture ==
Sacred bulls have held a place of significance in human culture since before the beginning of recorded history. They appear in cave paintings estimated to be up to 17,000 years old. The mythical Bull of Heaven plays a role in the ancient Sumerian Epic of Gilgamesh. The importance of the bull is reflected in its appearance in the zodiac as Taurus, and its numerous appearances in mythology, where it is often associated with fertility. See also Korban. In Hinduism, a bull named Nandi, usually depicted seated, is worshipped as the vehicle of the god Shiva and depicted on many of the images of that deity.

A bull head in the coat of arms of Joroinen

Symbolically, the bull appears commonly in heraldry. Bulls appear as charges and crests on the arms of several British families. Winged bulls appear as supporters in the arms of the Worshipful Company of Butchers. In modern times, the bull is used as a mascot by both amateur and professional sports teams.

Bulls also have a special significance in Spanish culture, where the Running of the Bulls celebration occurs every year in summer. During this festival, a group of human runners called "mozos" try to outrace a group of bulls running behind them, while large crowds watch the entire race.

Popular NBA team the Chicago Bulls features a bull in its branding, mascot, and merchandise.

== Gallery ==
A bull mating a heifer.

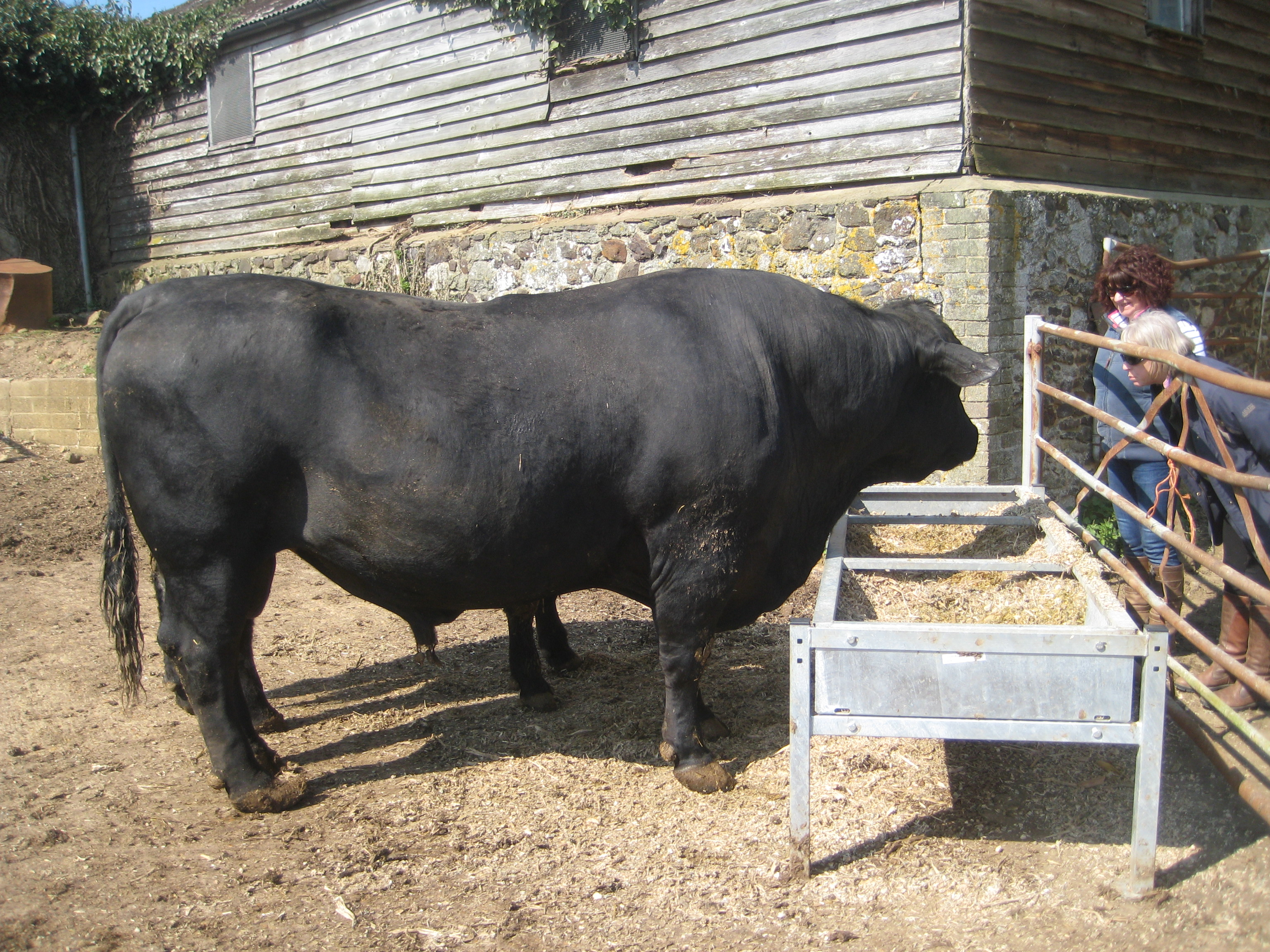
A bull eating

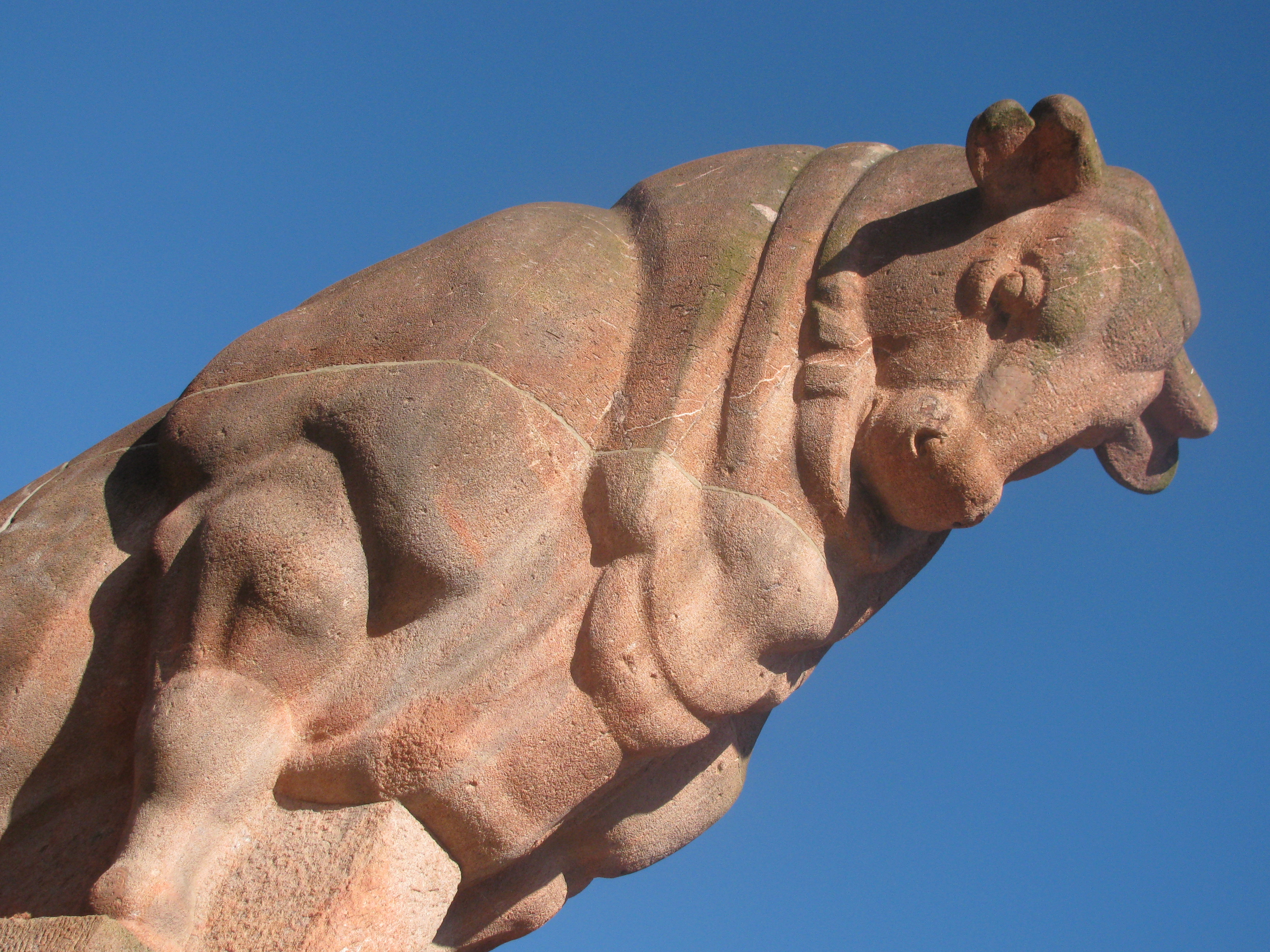
Bull statue at the Fertility Fountain, Arnswalder Platz, Berlin

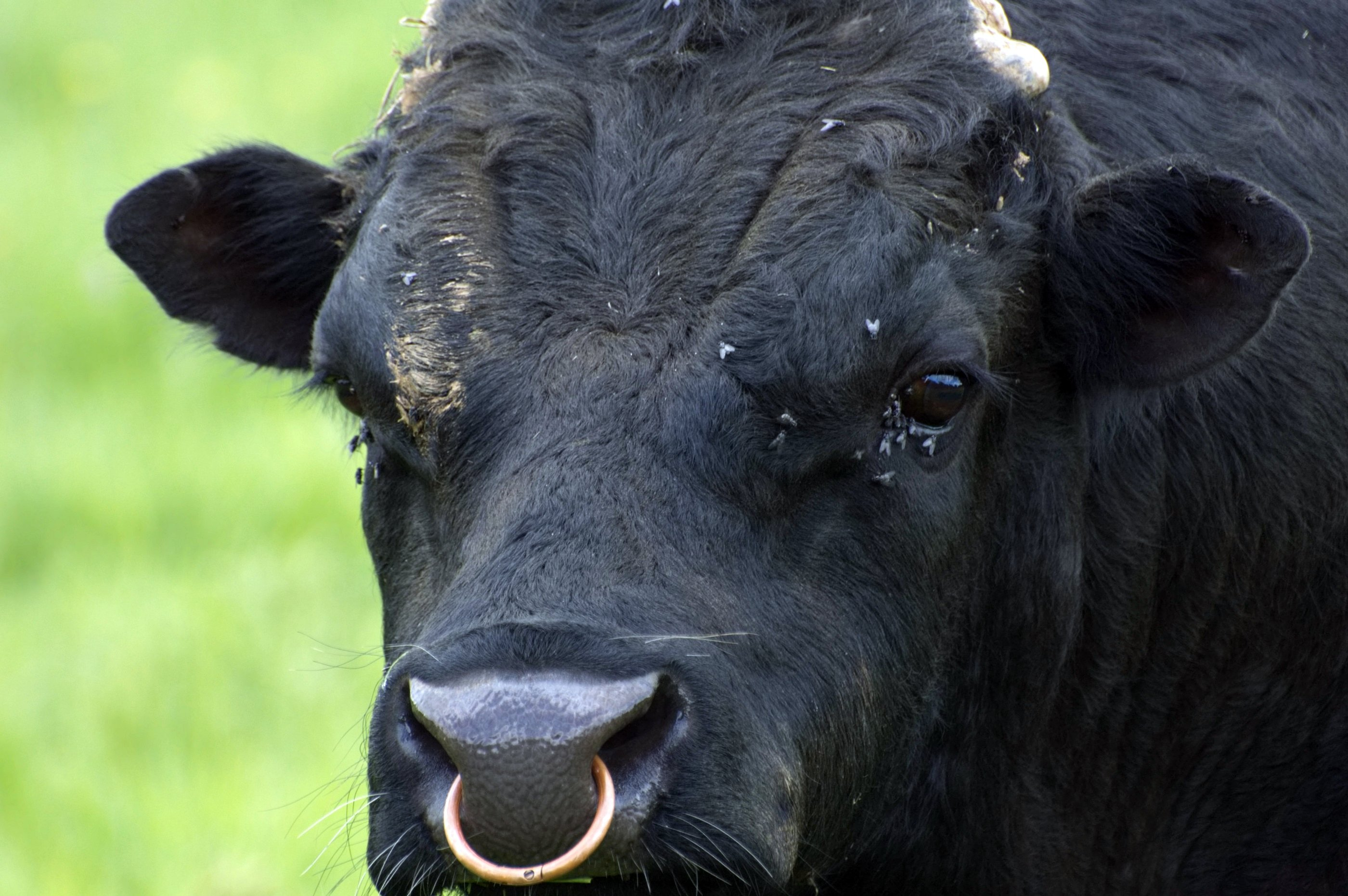
A black Dexter bull with nose ring

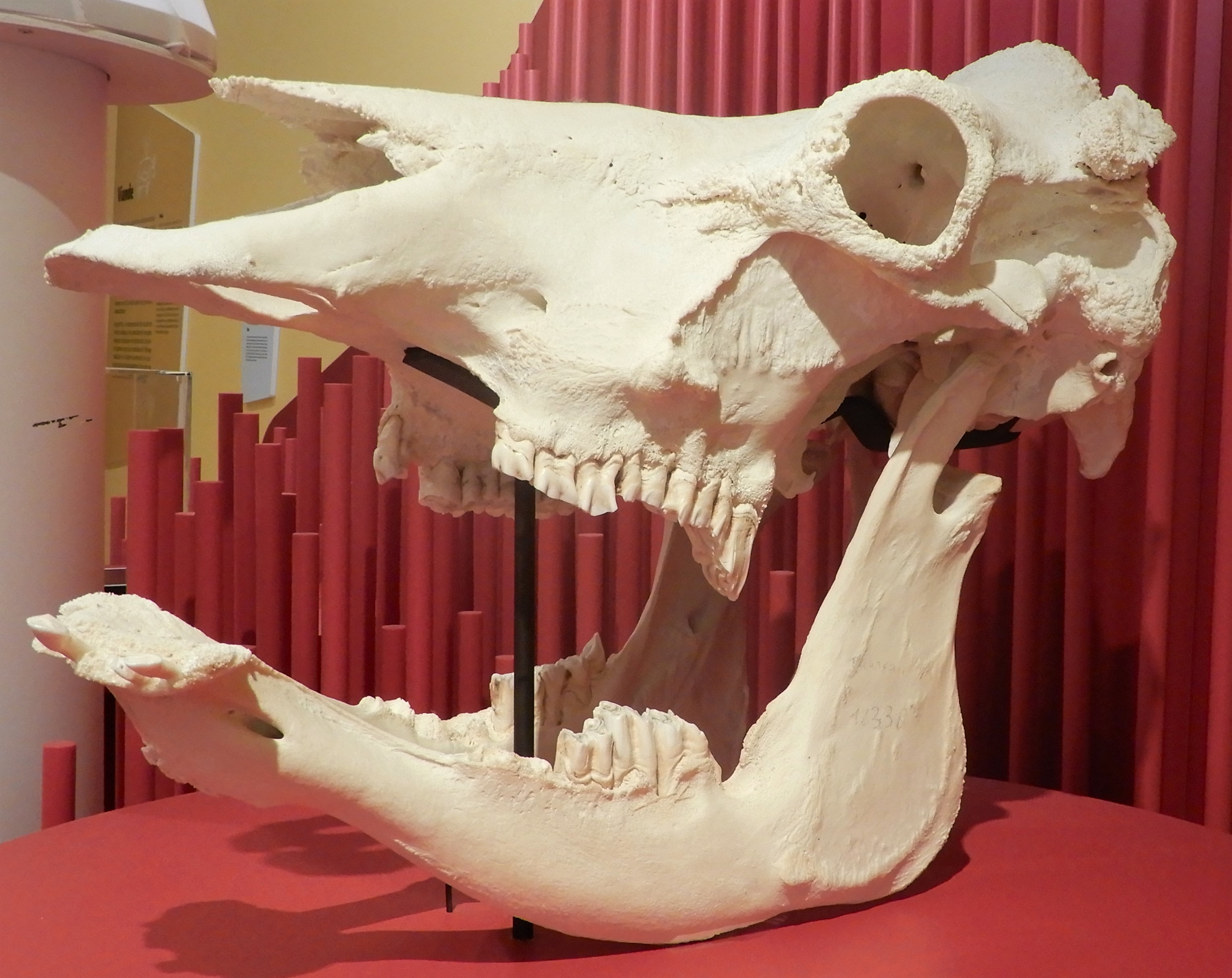
Skull of the bull Jocko-Besné

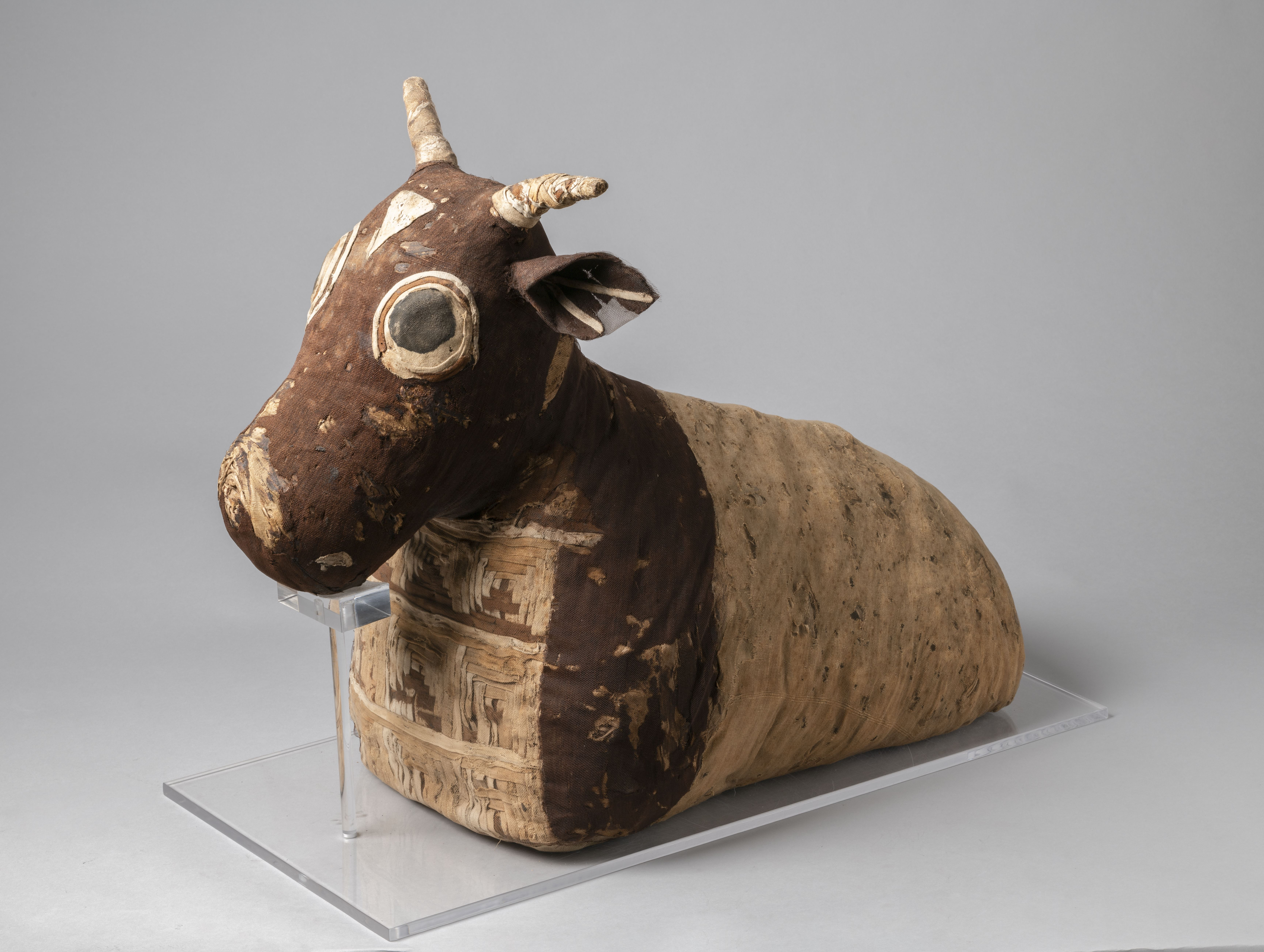
Mummy of a bull, Museo Egizio, Turin, Italy

== See also ==
- Cow-calf operation
- Bull market
- Taurus (astrology)
- Taurus (constellation)
- Ferdinand the Bull (film)
