= Extended breastfeeding =

Defined as beyond age 12–24 months

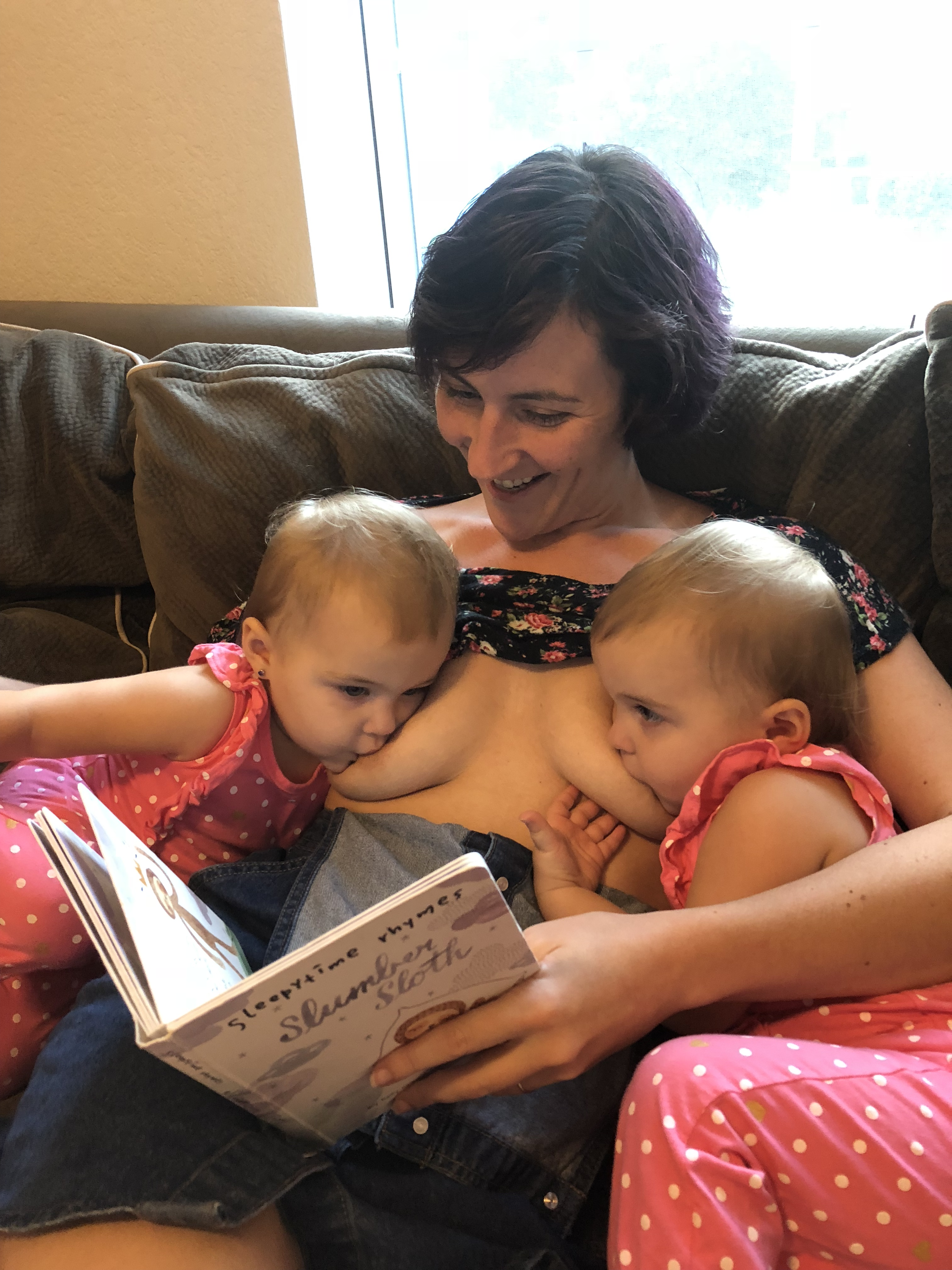
Two-year-old breastfeeding

In Western countries extended breastfeeding usually means breastfeeding beyond the age of 12 to 24 months, depending on the culture.

Breast milk contains lactoferrin, which protects the infant from infection caused by a wide range of pathogens. The amount of lactoferrin in breast milk increases significantly during the months of 12 through 24 and remains elevated for as long as the infant continues to nurse. Research shows breastfed toddlers aged over 12 months have lower mortality rates. La Leche League writes that extended nursing provides comfort, security, and a way to calm down for the toddler, while the mother enjoys a feeling of closeness with her child.

In most Western countries, extended breastfeeding is not a cultural norm and a person may face judgement with some critics who say that extended nursing is harmful. However, the American Academy of Pediatrics states there is no evidence that extended breastfeeding is harmful to the parent or child. The Academy of American Pediatrics makes a similar claim saying they find "no evidence of psychologic or developmental harm from breastfeeding into the third year of life or longer."

== Recommendations ==
- The World Health Organization and UNICEF recommends babies should be breastfed for at least two years.
- The American Academy of Family Physicians (AAFP) states that "[h]ealth outcomes for mothers and babies are best when breastfeeding continues for at least two years and continues as long as mutually desired by the parent and child.
- The American Academy of Pediatrics (AAP) supports "continued breastfeeding, along with appropriate complementary foods introduced at about 6 months, as long as mutually desired by mother and child for 2 years or beyond".

The CDC reports that about 36% of babies are still nursing at 12 months, while about 15% are still doing so by 18 months. Most toddlers naturally wean sometime between the ages of 2 and 4.

== Health benefits ==
Longitudinal research shows breastfed toddlers aged over 12 months have fewer illnesses and lower mortality rates. Breast milk is known to contain lactoferrin (Lf), which protects the infant from infection caused by a wide range of pathogens. The amount of Lf in breast milk is lactation-stage related. One study looked at Lf concentration in prolonged lactation from the first to the 48th month postpartum. It was found to be at the highest level in colostrum, dropped to the lowest level during 1 - 12 months of lactation, and then increased significantly during the 13-24 months of lactation, close to the Lf concentration in colostrum. At over 24 months the level dropped, though not significantly. These have been shown to support the child's immune system's antibodies.

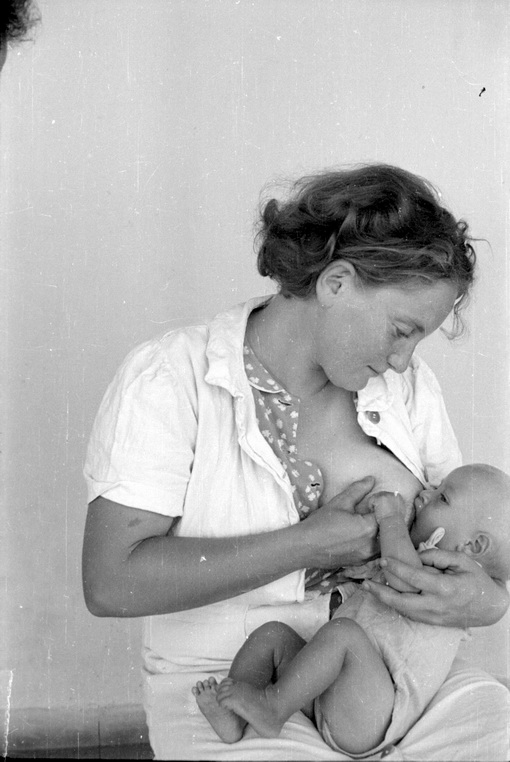
Breastfeeding

== Psychological effects ==
In A Time to Wean, Katherine Dettwyler states that "Western, industrialized societies can compensate for some (but not all) of the immunological benefits of breastfeeding with antibiotics, vaccines and improved sanitation. But the physical, cognitive, and emotional needs of the young child persist." Many children who are breast-fed into their toddler years use the milk as a comforting, bonding moment with their mothers. The La Leche League writes:

Toddlers breastfeed for many of the same reasons babies breastfeed: for nutrition, comfort, security, for a way to calm down and for reassurance. Mothers breastfeed their toddlers for many of the same reasons they breastfeed their babies: they recognize their children’s needs, they enjoy the closeness, they want to offer comfort, and they understand the health benefits.

While the personalized nutrients of their mother's breastmilk is beneficial to the child no matter how it is delivered (bottle or breast), being fed breastmilk through a bottle takes away some of the benefits of traditional breastfeeding. The physical contact that comes with traditional breastfeeding increases the release of oxytocin in both the mother and child's blood stream. This hormone is frequently referred to as the "love hormone" and plays an important role in the development of trust and bonding within a relationship. On top of the emotional bonding that comes with breastfeeding, it has been found that children who are breastfed develop language, intellectual, and motor skills both quicker and easier than those who are not and are less likely to contract a variety of viruses and diseases.

== Social acceptance ==
In most Western countries, extended breastfeeding is not a cultural norm and a person may face judgement and shaming. The American Academy of Family Physicians states, "There is no evidence that extended breastfeeding is harmful to parent or child." The Academy of American Pediatrics makes a similar claim saying they find "no evidence of psychologic or developmental harm from breastfeeding into the third year of life or longer."

== Practice by country or region ==
=== North America ===
Percentage of U.S. infants breastfeeding by month since birth. Dotted line: Exclusive breastfeeding Dashed line: Any breastfeeding * Estimated at 7 days after birth

Elizabeth Baldwin says in Extended Breastfeeding and the Law, "Because our culture tends to view the breast as sexual, it can be hard for people to realize that breastfeeding is the natural way to nurture children." In Western countries such as the United States, Canada and the United Kingdom, extended breastfeeding is a taboo act. It is difficult to obtain accurate information and statistics about extended breastfeeding in these countries because of the mother's embarrassment.^{[needs update]} Mothers who nurse longer than the social norm sometimes hide their practices from all but very close family members and friends. This is called "closet nursing".

In the United States, breastfeeding beyond 1 year is considered extended breastfeeding, and in contrast to WHO recommendations which recommend exclusive breastfeeding until six months, and "continued breastfeeding up to 2 years of age or beyond" [with the addition of complimentary foods], the American Academy of Pediatrics stated in 1997 that, "Breastfeeding should be continued for at least the first year of life and beyond for as long as mutually desired by mother and child".

In the United States overall, according to a 2010 CDC "report card", 43% of babies are breastfed until 6 months and 22.4% are breastfed until 12 months, though breastfeeding rates varied among the states.

Breastfeeding rates in the U.S. at 6 months rose from 34.2% in 2000 to 43.5% in 2006 and the rates at 12 months rose from 15.7% in 2000 to 22.7% in 2006. The U.S. Healthy People 2010 goals were to have at least 60% of babies exclusively breastfed at 3 months and 25% of babies exclusively breastfed at 6 months so this goal has yet to be met.

There have been several cases in the United States where children have been taken away from their mother's care because the courts or government agencies found the mother's extended breastfeeding to be inappropriate. In 1992, a New York mother lost custody of her child for a year. She was still breastfeeding the child at age 3 and had reported experiences of sexual arousal while breastfeeding the child. The authorities took the child from the home in the fear that the mother might sexually abuse the child. Later, the social service agency that took over the case said that there was more to the case than could be released to the press due to confidentiality laws. In 2000, an Illinois child was removed from the mother's care after a judge ruled that the child might suffer emotional damage as a result of not being weaned. The child was later returned to the mother and the judge vacated the finding of neglect. A social service agency in Colorado removed a 5-year-old child from the mother because she was still breastfeeding, but the court ordered the child returned to its family immediately.

=== Africa ===
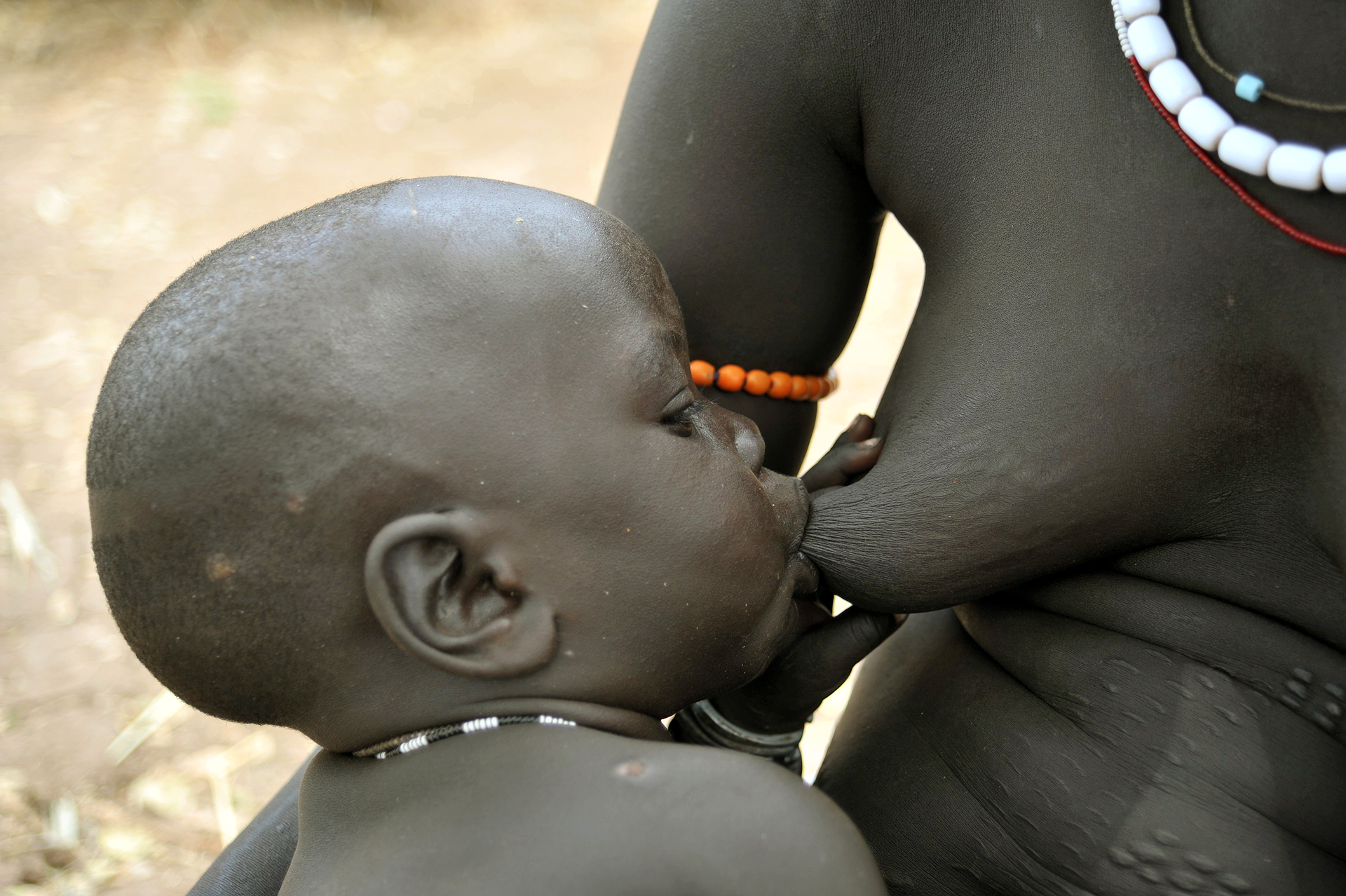
Ethiopian child breastfeeding

==== Guinea-Bissau ====
In Guinea-Bissau, the average length of breastfeeding is 22.6 months.

=== Asia and Oceania ===
==== India ====
In India, mothers commonly breastfeed their children until 2 to 3 years of age. Cow's milk is given in combination with breast milk though use of formula has been on the rise.

As of November 2012, the Ministry of Women and Child Development, with UNICEF as a technical partner, have kicked off a nationwide campaign to promote exclusive breastfeeding to infants up to the age of six months - one among a series of advisories it is issuing - as part of an awareness program targeted at eradicating malnutrition in the country. Indian actor Aamir Khan serves as the brand ambassador, and has acted in numerous televised public service announcements.

==== Philippines ====
In the Philippines, the Implementing Rules and Regulations of the Milk Code require that breastfeeding be encouraged for babies up to the age of 2 years old or beyond. Under the same code, it is illegal to advertise infant formula or breastmilk substitutes intended for children 24 months old and below. However, a 2008 WHO survey found that on average, mothers in the Philippines breastfed their babies until 14 months of age, with breastfeeding lasting up to 17 months on average in rural areas. Almost 58% of mothers surveyed around the nation were still breastfeeding their babies when the babies were a year old, and 34.2% of mothers were still breastfeeding when their babies were 2 years old.

In 2012, it was reported that legislation had been introduced which would narrow down the application of the Milk Code (reducing the period recommending against artificial baby foods for babies from 0 to 36 months to 0 to six months only), would lift the restriction on donations of artificial milk products in emergency situations (encouraging mothers with disabilities to shift to milk substitutes instead of encouraging them to continue breastfeeding assisted by support persons), would change the legally mandated lactation break period for breastfeeding mothers from paid to unpaid status, and would remove the ban on milk companies giving away free samples of artificial milk products in the health care system.

== In religion ==
=== Islam ===
The central scripture of Islam, Quran, instructs that children be breastfed for two years from birth. Islam relies on the Islamic calendar, in which "year" refers to a lunar year of 12 lunar cycles, totaling 354 days in length, potentially with the addition of 1 day for a leap year.
