= Clinical Obstetrics and Gynecology =

- Language: English
- Edited by: James R. Scott

Publication details
- History: 1958-present
- Publisher: Lippincott Williams & Wilkins
- Frequency: Quarterly
- Impact factor: 1.619 (2015)

Standard abbreviations
- ISO 4: Clin. Obstet. Gynecol.

Indexing
- CODEN: COGYAK
- ISSN: 0009-9201 (print); 1532-5520 (web)
- OCLC no.: 1784397

Links
- Journal homepage; Online access; Online archive

Clinical Obstetrics and Gynecology is a quarterly peer-reviewed medical journal covering obstetrics and gynecology. It was established in 1958 and is published by Lippincott Williams & Wilkins. The editor-in-chief is James R. Scott (University of Utah School of Medicine). According to the Journal Citation Reports, the journal has a 2015 impact factor of 1.619, ranking it 51st out of 80 journals in the category "Obstetrics & Gynecology".
