= Environmental impacts of animal agriculture =

Impact of farming animals on the environment

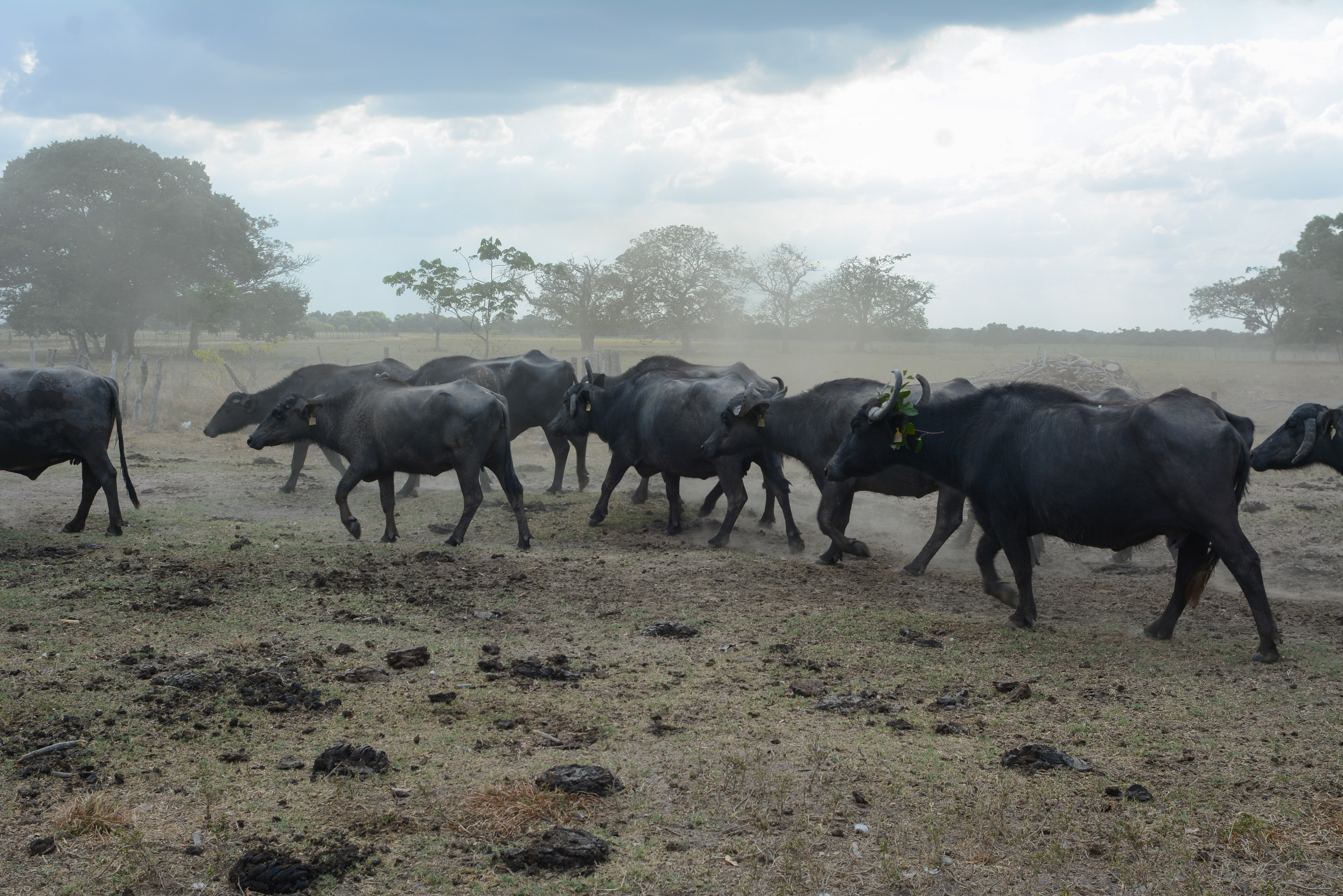
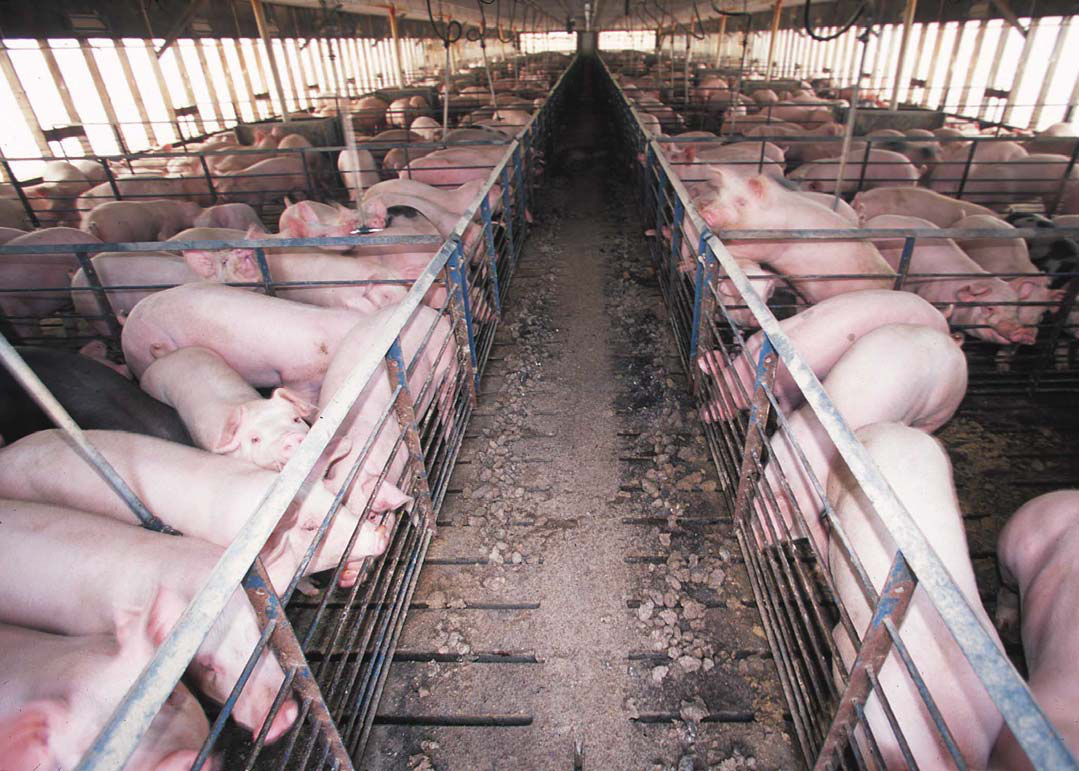
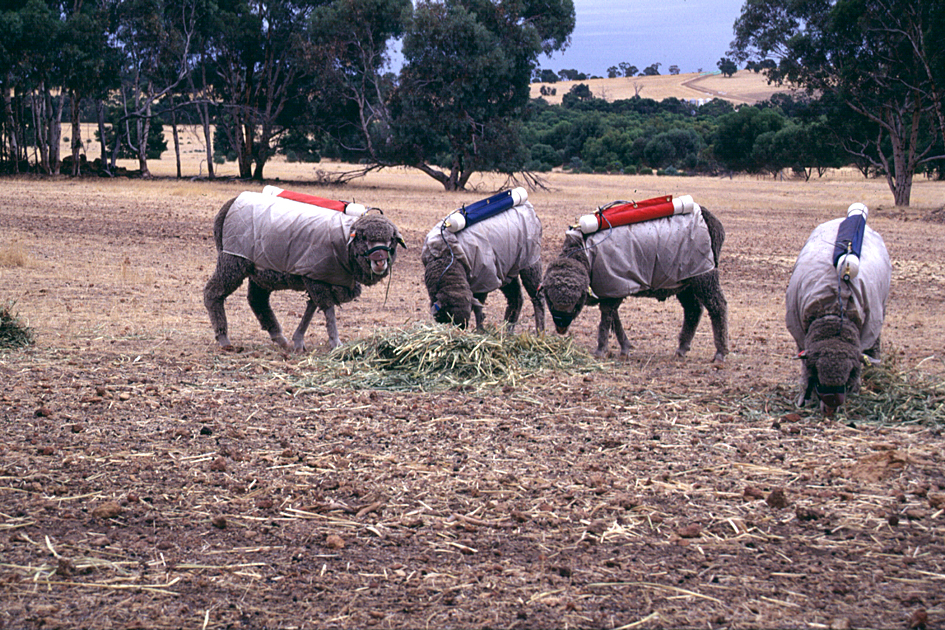
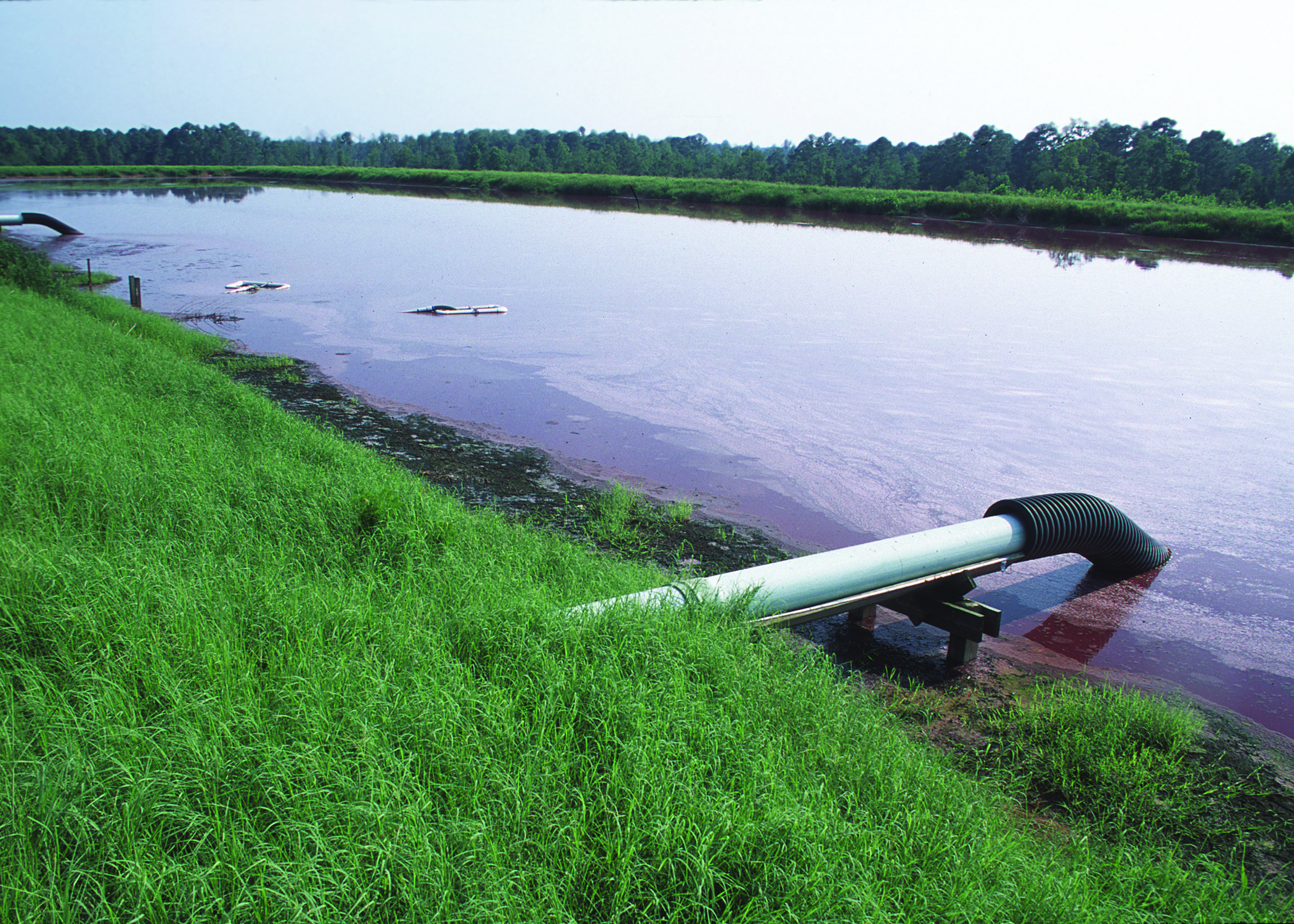
Examples of environmental impacts animal agriculture: Meat production is a main driver of deforestation in Venezuela; pigs in intensive farming; testing Australian sheep for exhaled methane production to reduce greenhouse gas emissions from agriculture; farms often pump their animal waste directly into a large lagoon, which has environmental consequences.

Agricultural practices have been found to have a variety of effects on the environment to some extent. Animal agriculture, in particular meat production, can cause pollution, greenhouse gas emissions, biodiversity loss, disease, and significant consumption of land, food, and water. Meat is obtained through a variety of methods, including organic farming, free-range farming, intensive livestock production, and subsistence agriculture. The livestock sector also includes wool, egg and dairy production, the livestock used for tillage, and fish farming.

Animal agriculture is a significant contributor to greenhouse gas emissions. Cows, sheep, and other ruminants digest their food by enteric fermentation, and their burps are the main source of methane emissions from land use, land-use change, and forestry. Together with methane and nitrous oxide from manure, this makes livestock the main source of greenhouse gas emissions from agriculture. A significant reduction in meat consumption is essential to mitigate climate change.

== Consumption and production trends ==
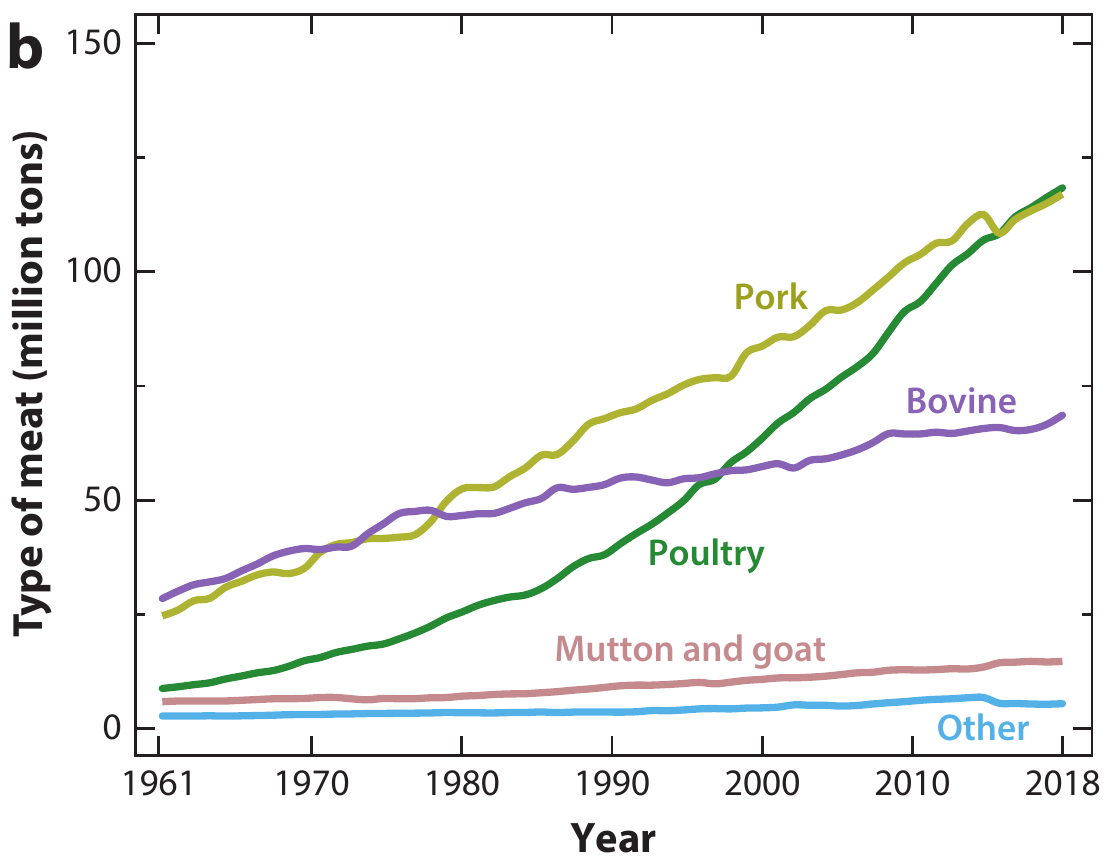
Total annual meat consumption by type of meat

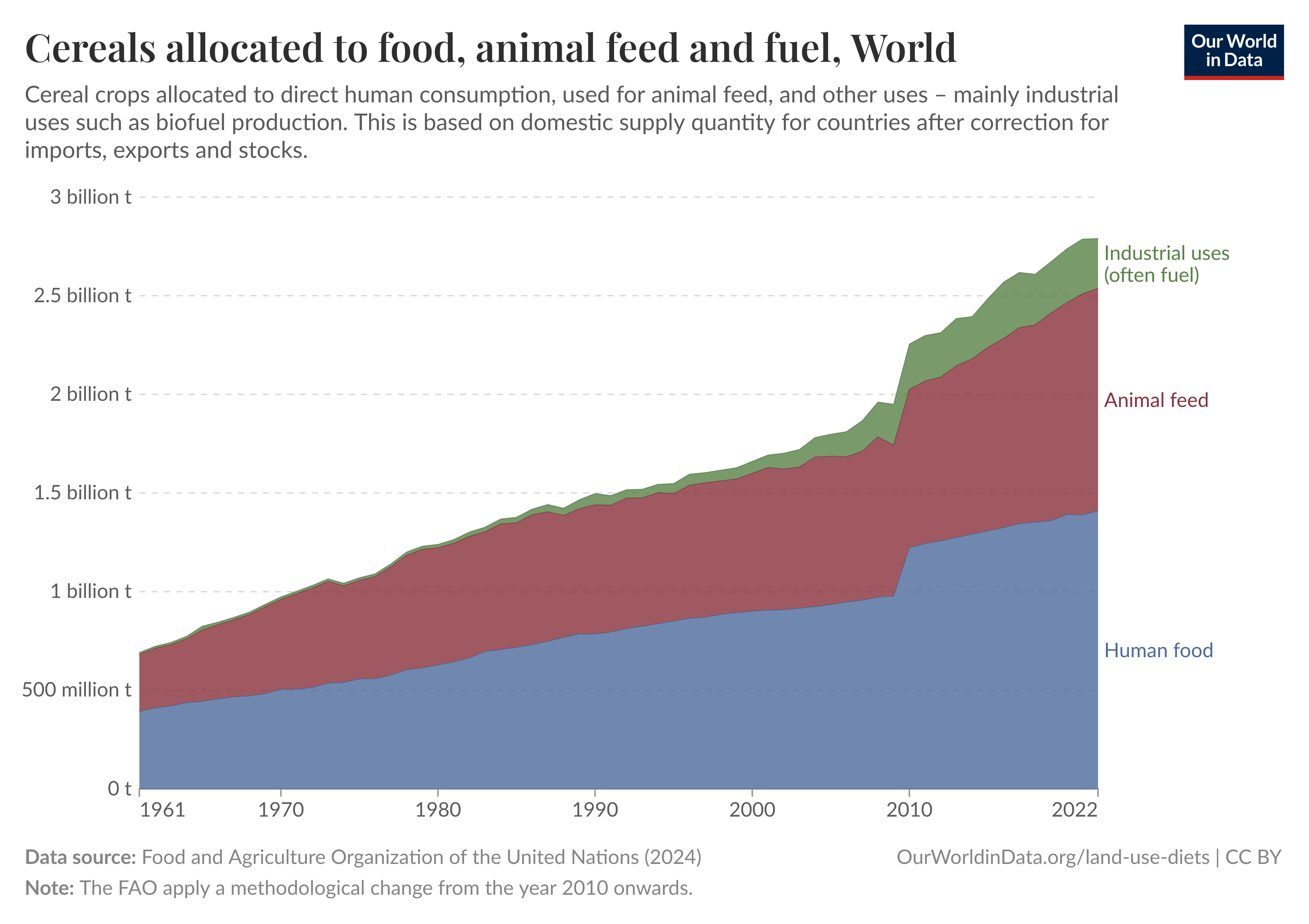
Cereal-use statistic show an estimated large fraction of crops used as fodder

Nutritional value and environmental impact of animal products, compared to agriculture overall
Categories	Contribution of farmed animal product [%]
Calories	18
Proteins	37
Land use	83
Greenhouse gases	58
Water pollution	57
Air pollution	56
Freshwater withdrawals	33

Multiple studies have found that increases in meat consumption are currently associated with human population growth and rising individual incomes or GDP, and therefore, the environmental impacts of meat production and consumption will increase unless current behaviours change.

Changes in demand for meat will influence how much is produced, thus changing the environmental impact of meat production. It has been estimated that global meat consumption may double from 2000 to 2050, mostly as a consequence of the increasing world population, but also partly because of increased per capita meat consumption (with much of the per capita consumption increase occurring in the developing world). The human population is projected to grow to 9 billion by 2050, and meat production is expected to increase by 40%. Global production and consumption of poultry meat have been growing recently at more than 5% annually. Meat consumption typically increases as people and countries get richer. Trends also vary among livestock sectors. For example, global pork consumption per capita has increased recently (almost entirely due to changes in consumption within China), while global consumption per capita of ruminant meats has been declining.

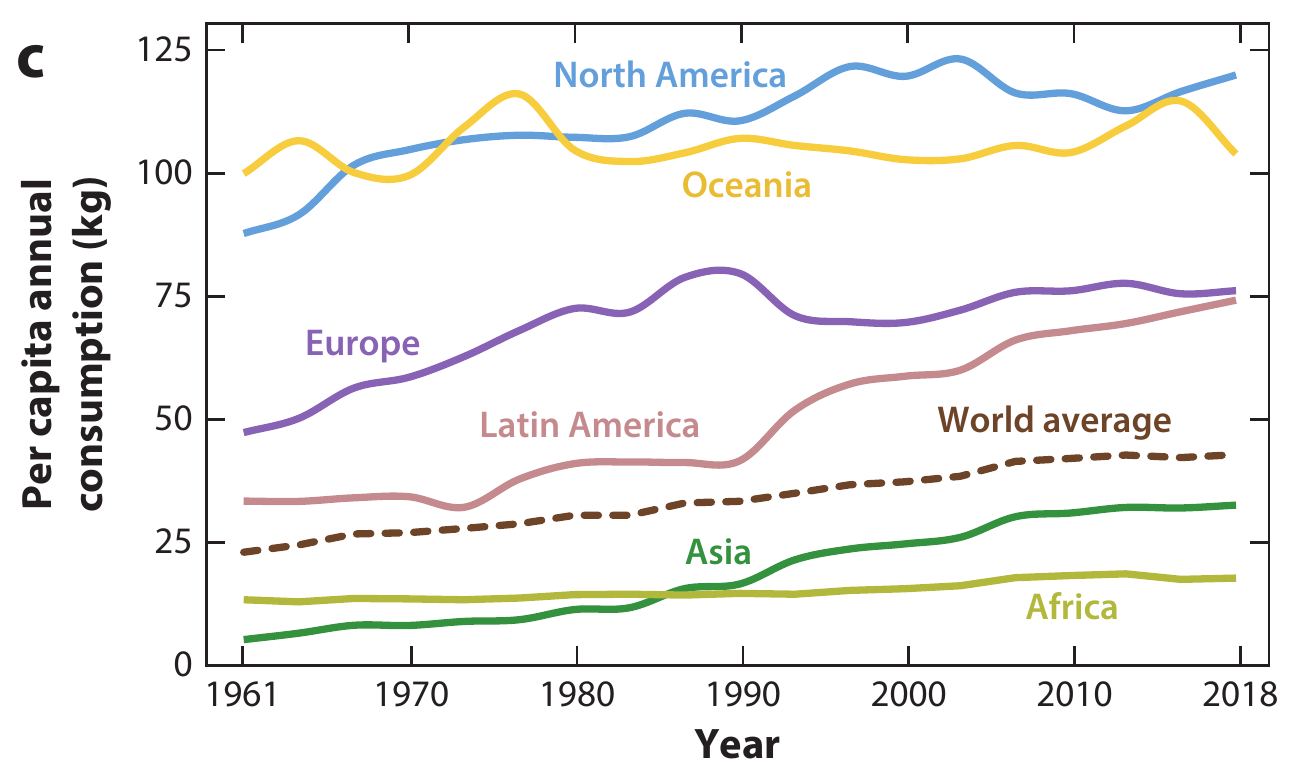
Per capita annual meat consumption by region

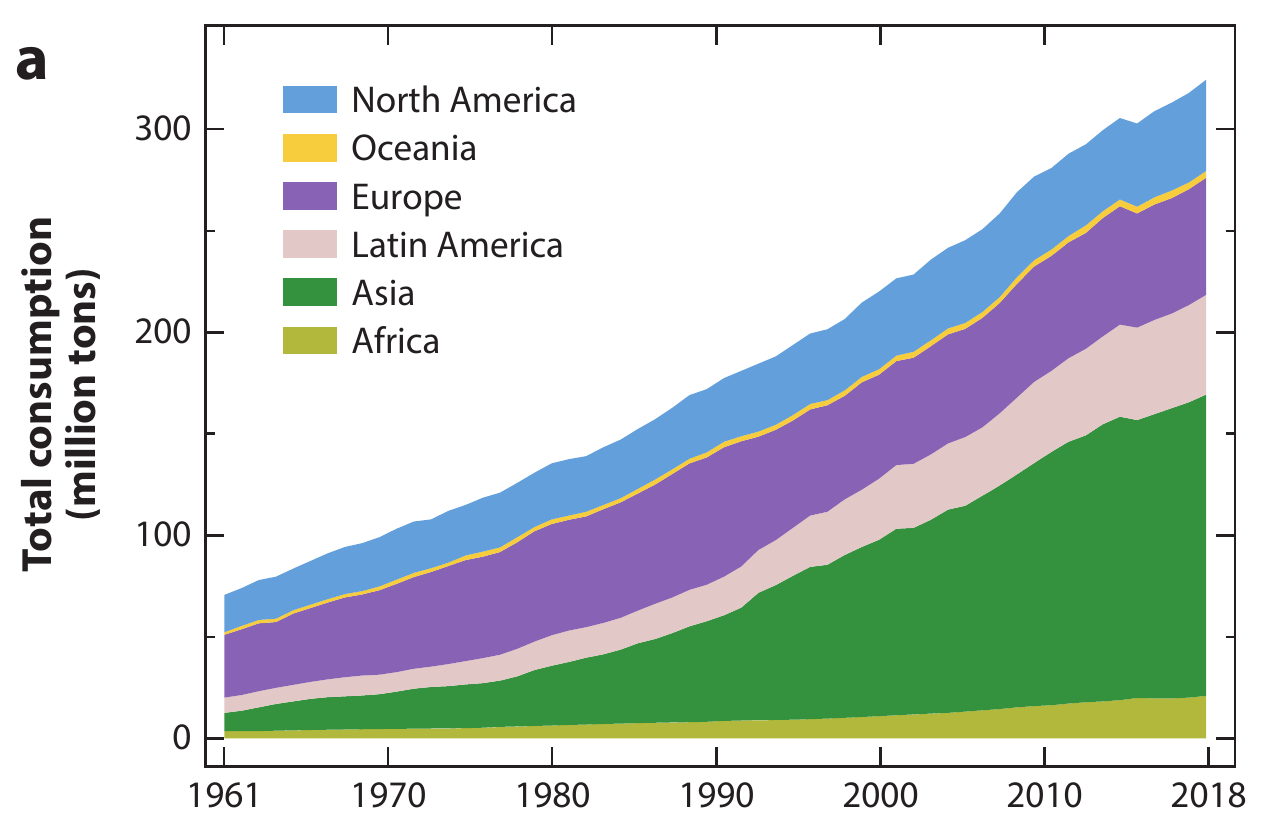
Total annual meat consumption by region

== Resource use ==
=== Food production efficiency ===
About 85% of the world's soybean crop is processed into meal and vegetable oil, and virtually all of that meal is used in animal feed. Approximately 6% of soybeans are used directly as human food, mostly in Asia.

For every 100 kilograms of food made for humans from crops, 37 kilograms of byproducts unsuitable for direct human consumption are generated. Many countries then repurpose these human-inedible crop byproducts as livestock feed for cattle. Raising animals for human consumption accounts for approximately 40% of total agricultural output in industrialized nations. Moreover, the efficiency of meat production varies depending on the specific production system, as well as the type of feed. It may require anywhere from 0.9 and 7.9 kilograms of grain to produce 1 kilogram of beef, between 0.1 to 4.3 kilograms of grain to produce 1 kilogram of pork, and 0 to 3.5 kilograms of grains to produce 1 kilogram of chicken.

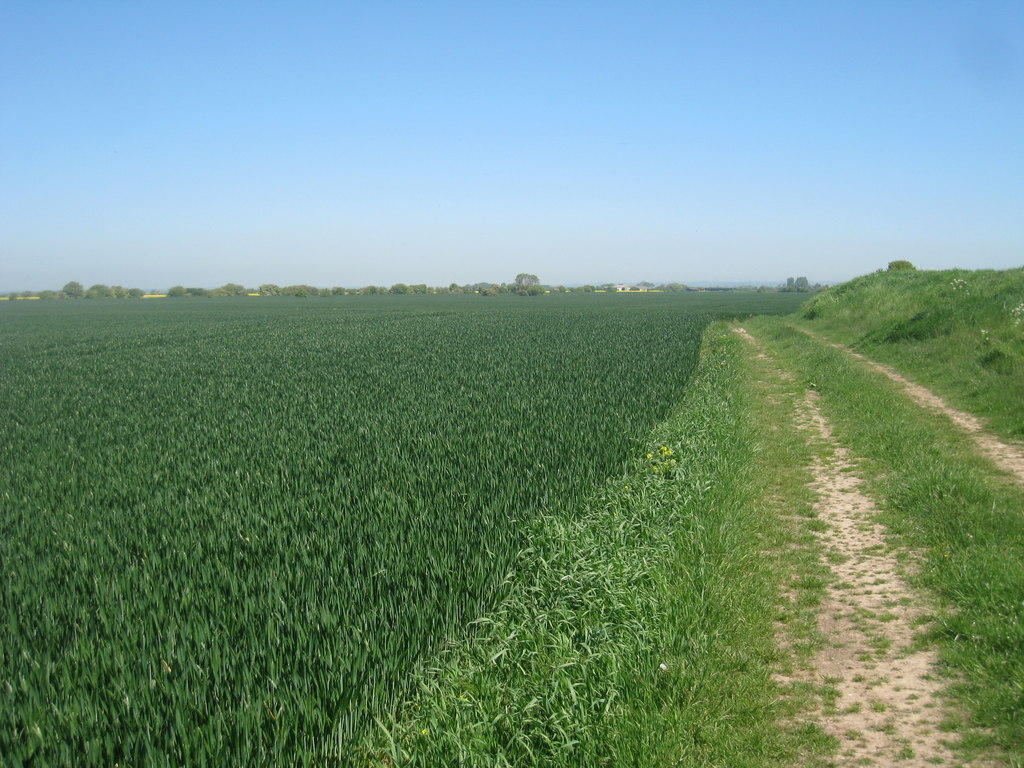
Field of crops for animal consumption. These fields occupy a large amount of land. This limits the land available for local people to grow crops for their own consumption.

FAO estimates, however, that about two thirds of the pasture area used by livestock is not convertible to crop-land.

Major corporations purchase land in different developing nations in Latin America and Asia to support large-scale production of animal feed crops, mainly corn and soybeans. This practice reduces the amount of land available for growing crops that are fit for human consumption in these countries, putting the local population at risk of food security.

According to a study conducted in Jiangsu, China, individuals with higher incomes tend to consume more food than those with lower incomes and larger families. Consequently, it is unlikely that those employed in animal feed production in these regions do not consume the animals that eat the crops they produce. The lack of space for growing crops for consumption, coupled with the need to feed larger families, only exacerbates their risk of losing food security.

According to FAO, crop-residues and by-products account for 24% of the total dry matter intake of the global livestock sector. A 2018 study found that, "Currently, 70% of the feedstock used in the Dutch feed industry originates from the food processing industry." Examples of grain-based waste conversion in the United States include feeding livestock the distillers grains (with solubles) remaining from ethanol production. For the marketing year 2009–2010, dried distillers grains used as livestock feed (and residual) in the US was estimated at 25.5 million metric tons. Examples of waste roughages include straw from barley and wheat crops (edible especially to large-ruminant breeding stock when on maintenance diets), and corn stover.

=== Land use ===
Mean land use of different foods
Food Types	Land Use (m^{2}year per 100g protein)
Lamb and mutton	185
Beef	164
Cheese	41
Pork	11
Poultry	7.1
Eggs	5.7
Farmed fish	3.7
Groundnuts	3.5
Peas	3.4
Tofu	2.2

Permanent meadows and pastures, grazed or not, occupy 26% of the Earth's ice-free terrestrial surface. Feed crop production uses about one-third of all arable land. More than one-third of U.S. land is used for pasture, making it the largest land-use type in the contiguous United States.

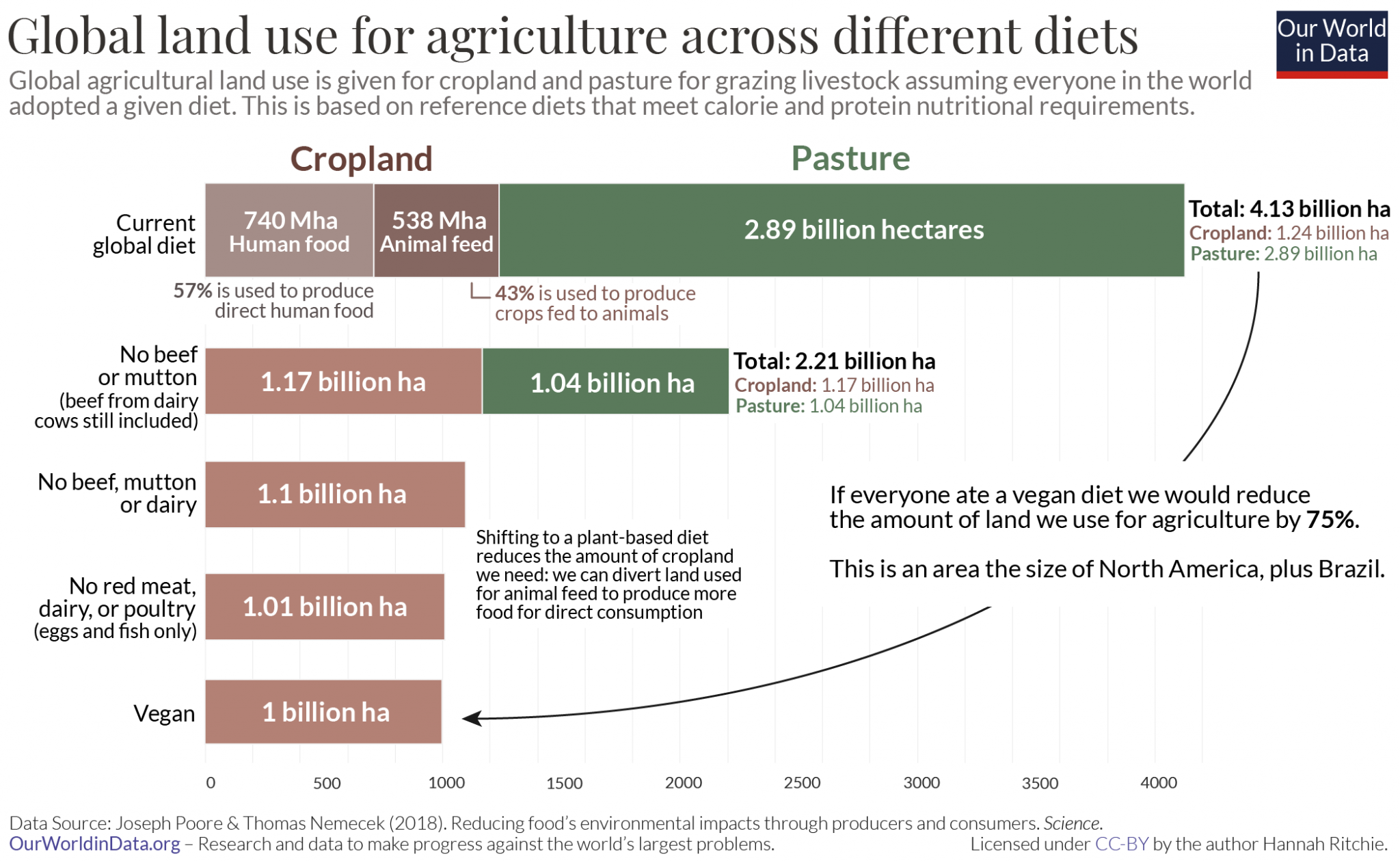
The amount of globally needed agricultural land would be reduced by almost half if no beef or mutton would be eaten.

In many countries, livestock graze from the land which mostly cannot be used for growing human-edible crops, as seen by the fact that there is three times as much agricultural land as arable land.

A 2023 study found that a vegan diet reduced land use by 75%.

Free-range animal production, particularly beef production, has also caused tropical deforestation because it requires land for grazing. The livestock sector is also the primary driver of deforestation in the Amazon, with around 80% of all deforested land being used for cattle farming. Additionally, 91% of deforested land since 1970 has been used for cattle farming. Research has argued that a shift to meat-free diets could provide a safe option to feed a growing population without further deforestation, and for different yields scenarios. However, according to FAO, grazing livestock in drylands "removes vegetation, including dry and flammable plants, and mobilizes stored biomass through depositions, which is partly transferred to the soil, improving fertility. Livestock is key to creating and maintaining specific habitats and green infrastructures, providing resources for other species and dispersing seeds".

The use of ever increasing amounts of land for meat production and livestock rearing instead of plants and grains for human diets is, according to sociologist David Nibert, "a leading cause of malnutrition, hunger, and famine around the world."

=== Water use ===
Freshwater withdrawals per kilogram of food product

Globally, the amount of water used for agricultural purposes exceeds any other industrialized purpose of water consumption. About 80% of water resources globally are used for agricultural ecosystems. In developed countries, up to 60% of total water consumption can be used for irrigation; in developing countries, it can be up to 90%, depending on the region's economic status and climate. According to the projected increase in food production by 2050, water consumption would need to increase by 53% to satisfy the world population's demands for meat and agricultural production.

Groundwater depletion is a concern in some areas because of sustainability issues (and in some cases, land subsidence and/or saltwater intrusion). A particularly important North American example of depletion is the High Plains (Ogallala) Aquifer, which underlies about 174,000 square miles in parts of eight states of the USA and supplies 30 percent of the groundwater withdrawn for irrigation there. Some irrigated livestock feed production is not hydrologically sustainable in the long run because of aquifer depletion. Rainfed agriculture, which cannot deplete its water source, produces much of the livestock feed in North America. Corn (maize) is of particular interest, accounting for about 91.8% of the grain fed to US livestock and poultry in 2010. About 14 percent of US corn-for-grain land is irrigated, accounting for about 17% of US corn-for-grain production and 13% of US irrigation water use, but only about 40% of US corn grain is fed to US livestock and poultry. Irrigation accounts for about 37% of US withdrawn freshwater use, and groundwater provides about 42% of US irrigation water. Irrigation water applied in the production of livestock feed and forage has been estimated to account for about 9 percent of withdrawn freshwater use in the United States.

Almost one-third of the water used in the western United States goes to crops that feed cattle. This is despite the claim that withdrawn surface water and groundwater used for crop irrigation in the US exceeds that for livestock by about a ratio of 60:1. This excessive use of river water distresses ecosystems and communities, and drives scores of species of fish closer to extinction during times of drought.

A 2023 study found that a vegan diet reduced water usage by 54%.

A study in 2019 focused on linkages between water usage and animal agricultural practices in China. The results of the study showed that water resources were being used primarily for animal agriculture; the highest categories were animal husbandry, agriculture, slaughtering and processing of meat, fisheries, and other foods. Together they accounted for the consumption of over 2400 billion m^{3} embodied water, roughly equating to 40% of total embodied water by the whole system. This means that more than one-third of China's entire water consumption is being used for food processing purposes, and mostly for animal agricultural practices.

Estimated water requirements for various foods
Foodstuff	Litres per			
Foodstuff	kilocalorie	gram of protein	kg of foodstuff	gram of fat
Sugar crops	0.69	N/A	197	N/A
Vegetables	1.34	26	322	154
Starchy roots	0.47	31	387	226
Fruits	2.09	180	962	348
Cereals	0.51	21	1644	112
Oil crops	0.81	16	2364	11
Pulses	1.19	19	4055	180
Nuts	3.63	139	9063	47
Milk	1.82	31	1020	33
Eggs	2.29	29	3265	33
Chicken meat	3.00	34	4325	43
Butter	0.72	N/A	5553	6.4
Pig meat	2.15	57	5988	23
Sheep/goat meat	4.25	63	8763	54
Bovine meat	10.19	112	15415	153

=== Water pollution ===
Water pollution due to animal waste is a common problem in both developed and developing nations. The USA, Canada, India, Greece, Switzerland and several other countries are experiencing major environmental degradation due to water pollution via animal waste. Concerns about such problems are particularly acute in the case of CAFOs (concentrated animal feeding operations). In the US, a permit for a CAFO requires the implementation of a plan for the management of manure nutrients, contaminants, wastewater, etc., as applicable, to meet requirements under the Clean Water Act. There were about 19,000 CAFOs in the US as of 2008. In fiscal 2014, the United States Environmental Protection Agency (EPA) concluded 26 enforcement actions for various violations by CAFOs.

A 2023 study found that a vegan diet reduced water pollution by 75%.

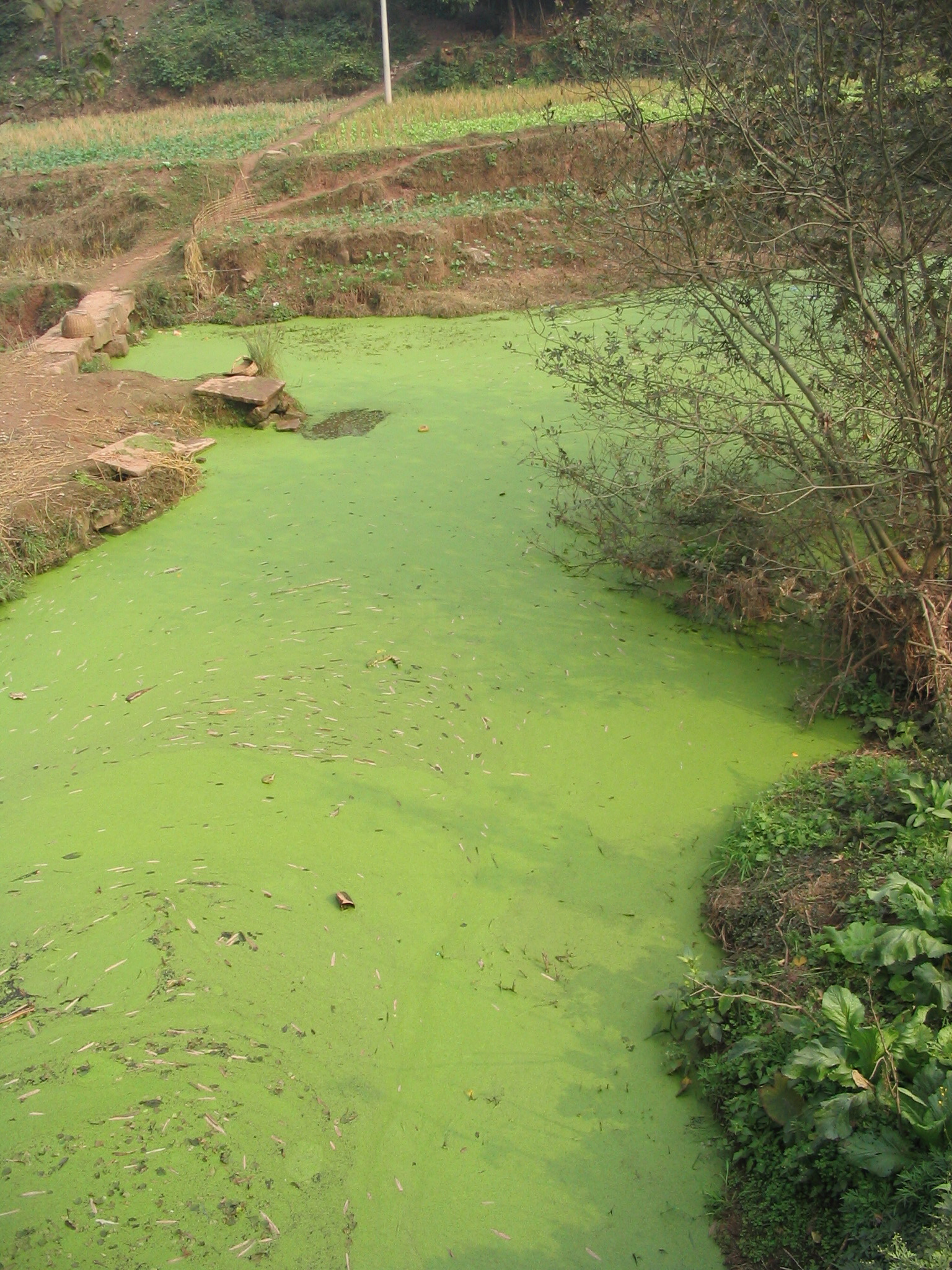
A green algae bloom has been observed in Sichuan, China. In normal conditions, river water is transparent, but algae blooms result in green algae covering the surface. This prevents other plants at the bottom of the river from getting sunlight, causing them to lose their ability to photosynthesise. Oxygen levels in rivers fall when there is no other vegetation, resulting in the death of other species.

Effective use of fertilizer is crucial to accelerate the growth of animal feed production, which in turn increases the amount of feed available for livestock. However, excess fertilizer can enter water bodies via runoff after rainfall, resulting in eutrophication. The addition of nitrogen and phosphorus can cause the rapid growth of algae, also known as an algae bloom. The reduction of oxygen and nutrients in the water caused by the growth of algae ultimately leads to the death of other species in the ecosystem. This ecological harm has consequences not only for the native animals in the affected water body but also for the water supply for people.

To dispose of animal waste and other pollutants, animal production farms often spray manure (often contaminated with potentially toxic bacteria) onto empty fields, called "spray-fields", via sprinkler systems. The toxins within these spray-fields oftentimes run into creeks, ponds, lakes, and other bodies of water, contaminating bodies of water. This process has also led to the contamination of drinking water reserves, harming the environment and citizens alike.

== Climate change aspects ==
=== Energy consumption ===
Energy efficiency of meat and dairy production

An important aspect of energy use in livestock production is the energy consumption that the animals contribute. Feed Conversion Ratio is an animal's ability to convert feed into meat. The Feed Conversion Ratio (FCR) is calculated by taking the energy, protein, or mass input of the feed divided by the output of meat provided by the animal. A lower FCR corresponds with a smaller requirement of feed per meat output, and therefore the animal contributes fewer GHG emissions. Chickens and pigs usually have a lower FCR compared to ruminants.

Intensification and other changes in the livestock industries influence energy use, emissions, and other environmental effects of meat production.

Manure can also have environmental benefits as a renewable energy source, in digester systems yielding biogas for heating and/or electricity generation. Manure biogas operations can be found in Asia, Europe, North America, and elsewhere. System cost is substantial, relative to US energy values, which may be a deterrent to more widespread use. Additional factors, such as odour control and carbon credits, may improve benefit-to-cost ratios. Manure can be mixed with other organic wastes in anaerobic digesters to take advantage of economies of scale. Digested waste is more uniform in consistency than untreated organic wastes, and can have higher proportions of nutrients that are more available to plants, which enhances the utility of digestate as a fertiliser product. This encourages circularity in meat production, which is typically difficult to achieve due to environmental and food safety concerns.

=== Greenhouse gas emissions ===
Livestock produces the majority of greenhouse gas emissions from agriculture and demands around 30% of agricultural freshwater needs, while only supplying 18% of the global calorie intake. Animal-derived food plays a larger role in meeting human protein needs, yet is still a minority of supply at 39%, with crops providing the rest.At the same time, livestock farming is affected by climate change.

Out of the Shared Socioeconomic Pathways used by the Intergovernmental Panel on Climate Change, only SSP1 offers any realistic possibility of meeting the 1.5 °C (2.7 °F) target. Together with measures like a massive deployment of green technology, this pathway assumes animal-derived food will play a lower role in global diets relative to now. As a result, there have been calls for phasing out subsidies currently offered to livestock farmers in many places worldwide, and net zero transition plans now involve limits on total livestock headcounts, including substantial reductions of existing stocks in some countries with extensive animal agriculture sectors like Ireland. Yet, an outright end to human consumption of meat and animal products is not currently considered a realistic goal. Therefore, any comprehensive plan of adaptation to the effects of climate change, particularly the present and future effects of climate change on agriculture, must also consider livestock.

Livestock activities also contribute disproportionately to land-use effects, since crops such as corn and alfalfa are cultivated to feed the animals.

In 2010, enteric fermentation accounted for 43% of the total greenhouse gas emissions from all agricultural activity in the world. The meat from ruminants has a higher carbon equivalent footprint than other meats or vegetarian sources of protein based on a global meta-analysis of lifecycle assessment studies. Small ruminants such as sheep and goats contribute approximately 475 million tons of carbon dioxide equivalent to GHG emissions, which constitutes around 6.5% of world agriculture sector emissions. Methane production by animals, principally ruminants, makes up an estimated 15-20% of global production of methane.

==== Methane and nitrous oxide emissions from cattle ====
The Food and Agriculture Organization estimates that in 2015 around 7% of global greenhouse gas emissions (GHG) were due to cattle, (Note: FAO say that in 2015 livestock production created around 12% of greenhouse gas emissions, some 62% of which is due to cattle, thus 7%.) but this is uncertain. Another estimate is 12% of global GHG. More recently Climate Trace estimates 4.5% directly from cattle in 2022. Reducing methane emissions quickly helps limit climate change.

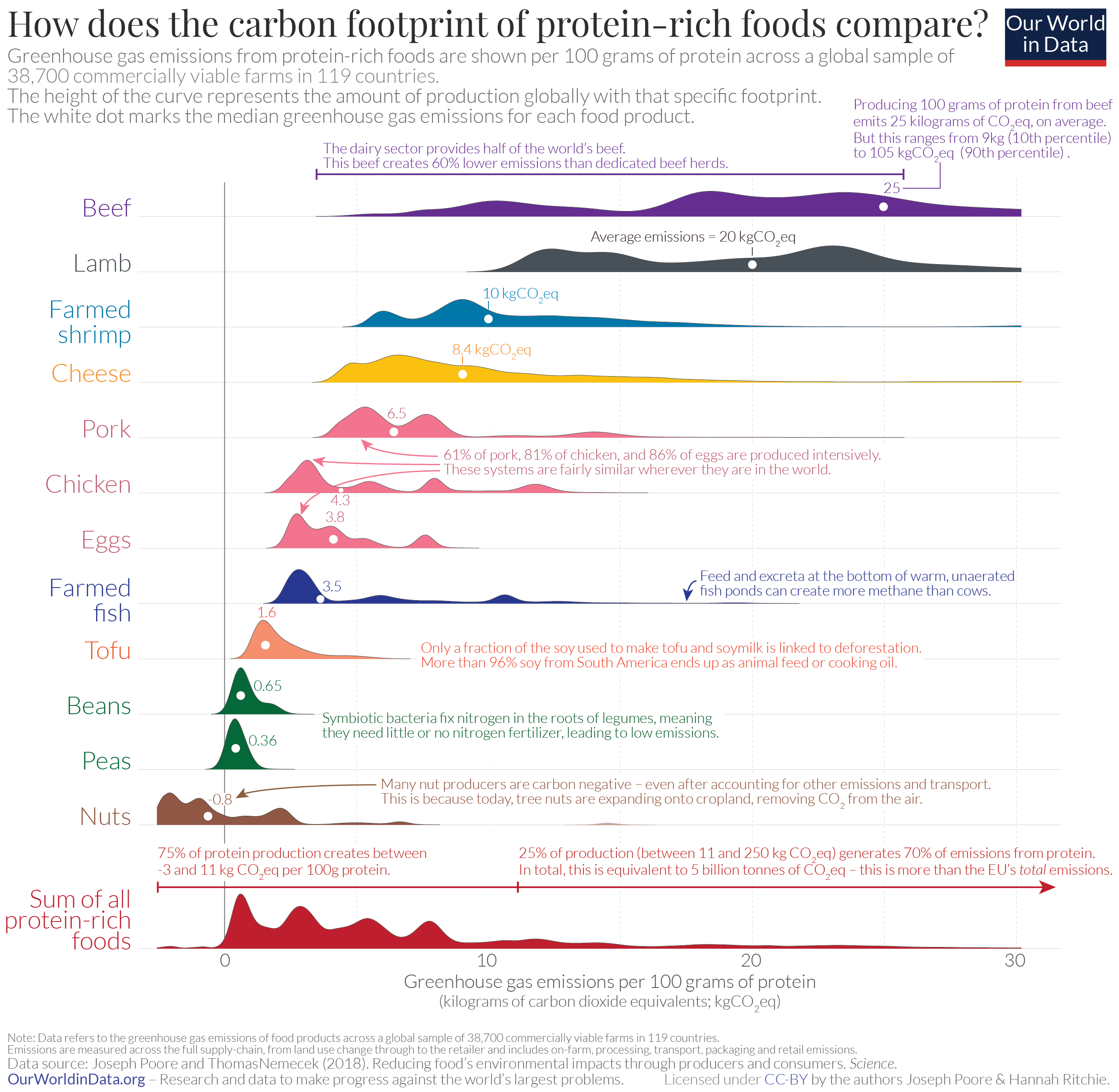
Beef and lamb have the largest carbon footprint of protein-rich foods.

Estimates by Climate TRACE
Billion tonnes CO2eq (% of total global emissions)	2022	2023
Enteric fermentation cattle feedlot	7.95 (1.76)	
Enteric fermentation cattle pasture	8.55 (1.90)	
Manure left on pasture cattle	2.91 (0.65)	
Manure management cattle feedlot	0.70 (0.16)	
Total	20.11 (4.47)	

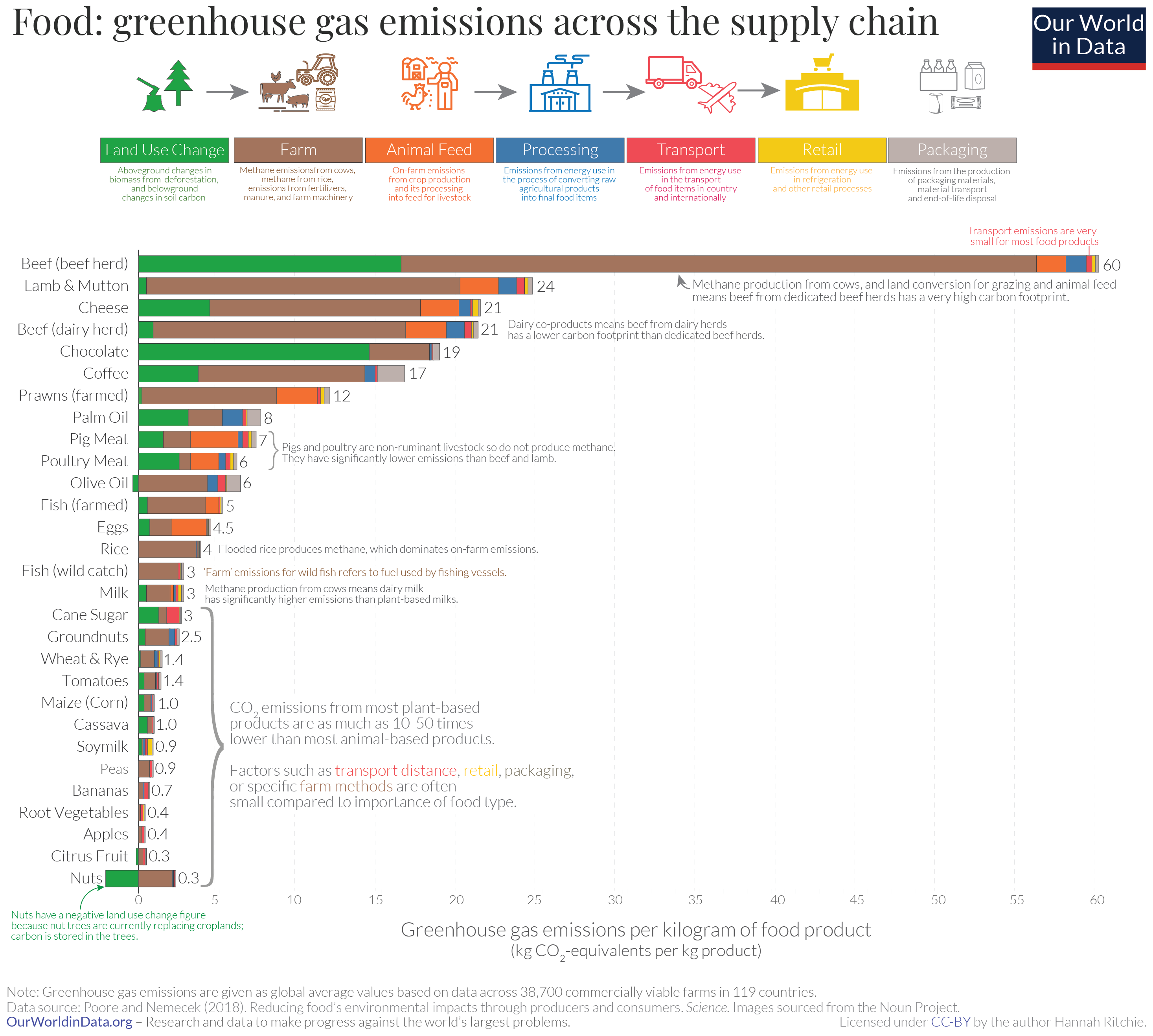
Methane production from cows, and land conversion for grazing and animal feed mean beef from dedicated beef herds has a very high carbon footprint.

Gut flora in cattle include methanogens that produce methane as a byproduct of enteric fermentation, which cattle belch out. Additional methane is produced by anaerobic fermentation of manure in manure lagoons and other manure storage structures. Manure can also release nitrous oxide. Over 20 years atmospheric methane has 81 times the global warming potential of the same amount of atmospheric carbon dioxide.

As conditions vary a lot the IPCC would like these taken into account when estimating methane emissions, in other words countries where cattle are significant should use Tier 3 methods in their national greenhouse gas inventories. Although well-managed perennial pastures sequester carbon in the soil, as of 2023 life cycle assessments are required to fully assess pastoral dairy farms in all environments.

=== Mitigation options ===
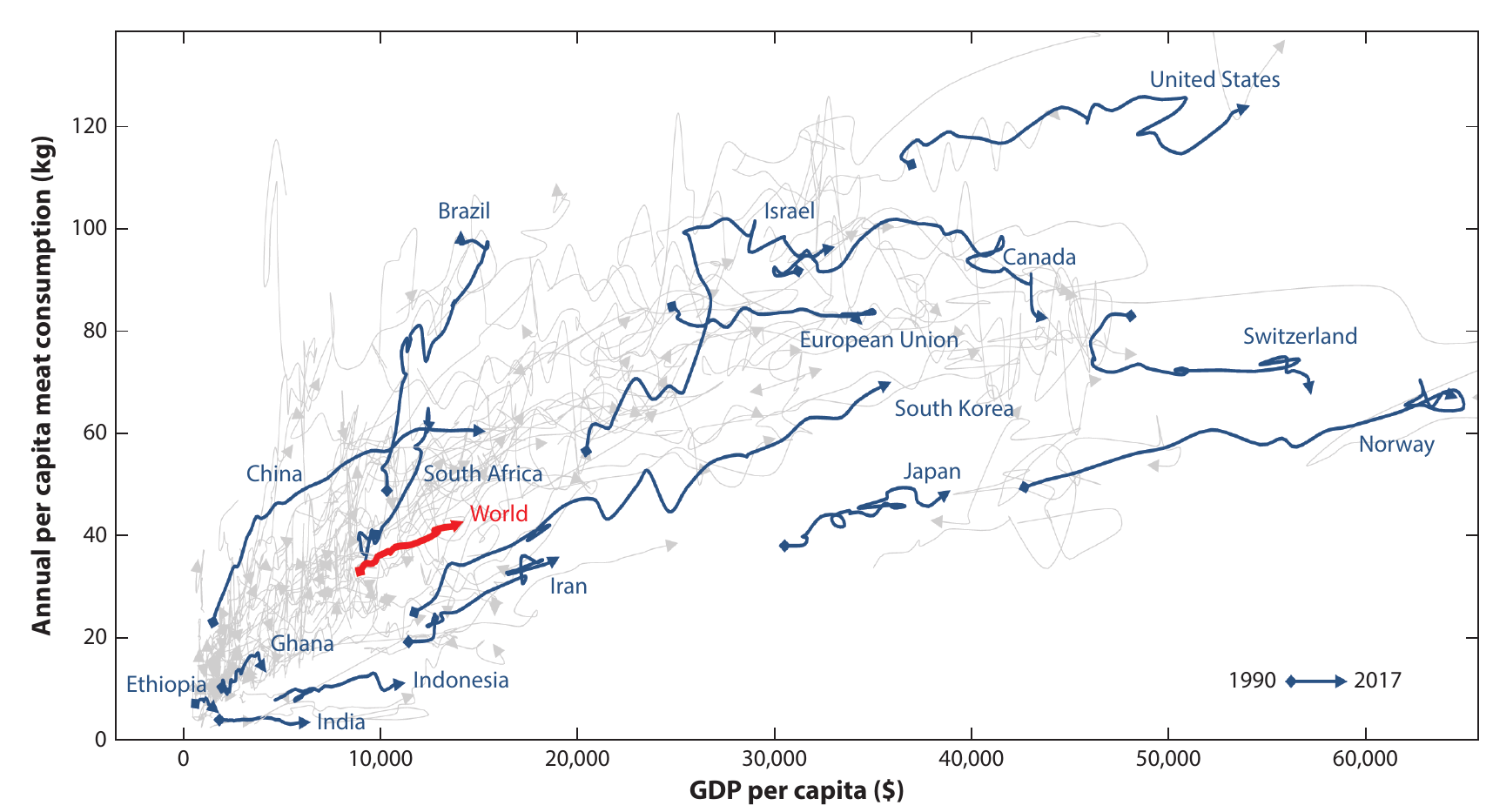
Per capita meat consumption and GDP 1990–2017

Mitigation options for reducing methane emission from livestock include a change in diet, that is consuming less meat and dairy. A significant reduction in meat consumption will be essential to mitigate climate change, especially as the human population increases by a projected 2.3 billion by the middle of the century. A 2019 report in The Lancet recommended that global meat consumption be halved to mitigate climate change. A study quantified climate change mitigation potentials of 'high-income' nations shifting diets – away from meat-consumption – and restoration of the spared land, finding that if these were combined they could "reduce annual agricultural production emissions of high-income nations' diets by 61%".

In addition to reduced consumption, emissions can also be reduced by changes in practice. One study found that shifting compositions of current feeds, production areas, and informed land restoration could enable greenhouse gas emissions reductions of 34–85% annually (612–1,506 megatons CO_{2} equivalent per year) without increasing costs or changing diets.

Producers can reduce ruminant enteric fermentation using genetic selection, immunization, rumen defaunation, competition of methanogenic archaea with acetogens, introduction of methanotrophic bacteria into the rumen, diet modification and grazing management, among others. The principal mitigation strategies identified for reduction of agricultural nitrous oxide emissions are avoiding over-application of nitrogen fertilizers and adopting suitable manure management practices. Mitigation strategies for reducing carbon dioxide emissions in the livestock sector include adopting more efficient production practices to reduce agricultural pressure for deforestation (such as in Latin America), reducing fossil fuel consumption, and increasing carbon sequestration in soils.

Methane belching from cattle might be reduced by intensification of farming, selective breeding, immunization against the many methanogens, rumen defaunation (killing the bacteria-killing protozoa), diet modification (e.g. seaweed fortification using species such as Asparagopsis, cultivated at scale by companies such as Asparagopsis Technologies), decreased antibiotic use, and grazing management.

Measures that increase state revenues from meat consumption/production could enable the use of these funds for related research and development and "to cushion social hardships among low-income consumers". Meat and livestock are important sectors of the contemporary socioeconomic system, with livestock value chains employing an estimated >1.3 billion people.

Sequestering carbon into soil is currently not feasible to cancel out planet-warming emissions caused by the livestock sector. The global livestock annually emits 135 billion metric tons of carbon, way more than can be returned to the soil. Despite this, the idea of sequestering carbon to the soil is currently advocated by livestock industry as well as grassroots groups.

Agricultural subsidies for cattle and their feedstock could be stopped. A more controversial suggestion, advocated by George Monbiot in the documentary "Apocalypse Cow", is to stop farming cattle completely, however farmers often have political power so might be able to resist such a big change.

== Effects on ecosystems ==
=== Soils ===
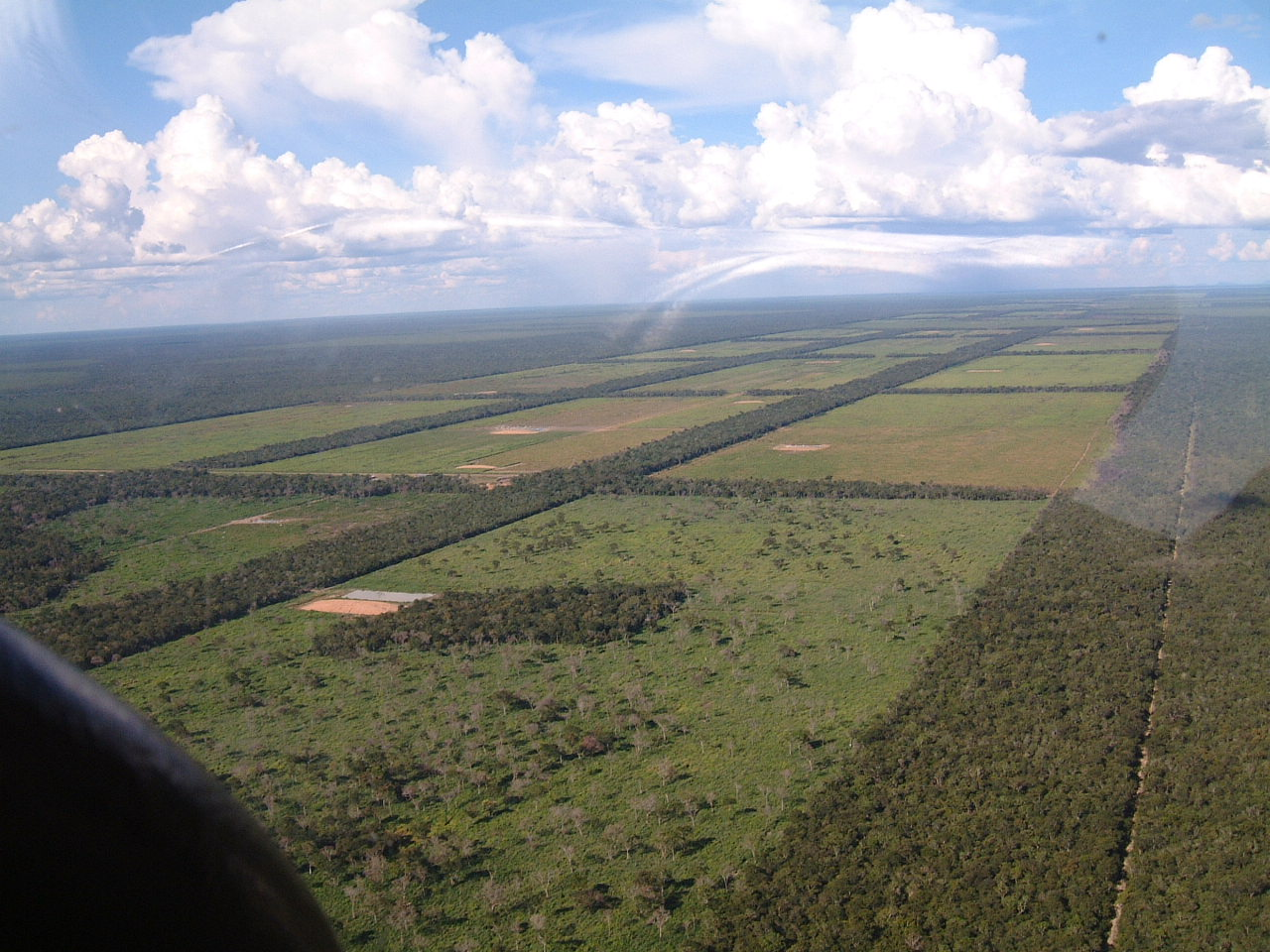
Clearings for cattle grazing in the Chaco region of Paraguay

Grazing can have positive or negative effects on rangeland health, depending on management quality, and grazing can have different effects on different soils and different plant communities. Grazing can sometimes reduce, and other times increase, biodiversity of grassland ecosystems. In beef production, cattle ranching helps preserve and improve the natural environment by maintaining habitats that are well suited for grazing animals. Lightly grazed grasslands also tend to have higher biodiversity than overgrazed or non-grazed grasslands. Overgrazing can decrease soil quality by constantly depleting it of necessary nutrients. By the end of 2002, the US Bureau of Land Management (BLM) found that 16% of the evaluated 7,437 grazing allotments had failed to meet rangeland health standards because of their excessive grazing use. Overgrazing appears to cause soil erosion in many dry regions of the world. However, on US farmland, soil erosion is much less on land used for livestock grazing than on land used for crop production. According to the US Natural Resources Conservation Service, on 95.1% of US pastureland, sheet and rill erosion are within the estimated soil loss tolerance, and on 99.4% of US pastureland, wind erosion is within the estimated soil loss tolerance.

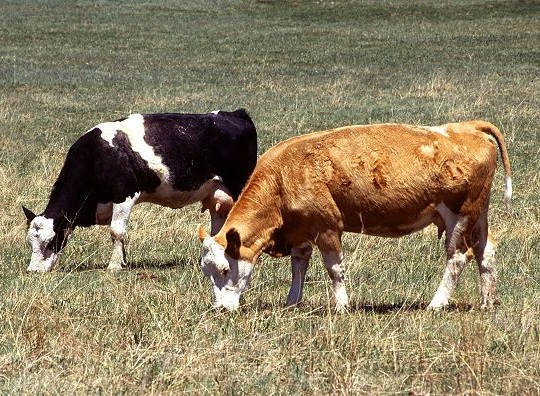
Dryland grazing on the Great Plains in Colorado

Grazing can affect the sequestration of carbon and nitrogen in the soil. This sequestration helps mitigate the effects of greenhouse gas emissions, and in some cases, increases ecosystem productivity by affecting nutrient cycling. A 2017 meta-study of the scientific literature estimated that the total global soil carbon sequestration potential from grazing management ranges from 0.3–0.8 gigatons CO_{2}eq per year, which is equivalent to 4–11% of total global livestock emissions, but that "Expansion or intensification in the grazing sector as an approach to sequestering more carbon would lead to substantial increases in methane, nitrous oxide and land use change-induced CO2 emissions". Project Drawdown estimates the total carbon sequestration potential of improved managed grazing at 13.72–20.92 gigatons CO_{2}eq between 2020–2050, equal to 0.46–0.70 gigatons CO_{2}eq per year. A 2022 peer-reviewed paper estimated the carbon sequestration potential of improved grazing management at a similar level of 0.15–0.70 gigatons CO_{2}eq per year. A 2021 peer-reviewed paper found that sparsely grazed and natural grasslands account for 80% of the total cumulative carbon sink of the world's grasslands, whereas managed grasslands have been a net greenhouse gas source over the past decade. Another peer-reviewed paper found that if current pastureland was restored to its former state as wild grasslands, shrublands, and sparse savannas without livestock this could store an estimated 15.2–59.9 gigatons additional carbon. A study found that grazing in US virgin grasslands causes the soil to have lower soil organic carbon but higher soil nitrogen content. In contrast, at the High Plains Grasslands Research Station in Wyoming, the soil in the grazed pastures had more organic carbon and nitrogen in the top 30 cm than the soil in non-grazed pastures. Additionally, in the Piedmont region of the US, well-managed grazing of livestock on previously eroded soil resulted in high rates of beneficial carbon and nitrogen sequestration compared to non-grazed grass.

In Canada, a review highlighted that the methane and nitrous oxide emitted from manure management comprised 17% of agricultural greenhouse gas emissions, while nitrous oxide emitted from soils after application of manure, accounted for 50% of total emissions.

Manure provides environmental benefits when properly managed. Deposition of manure on pastures by grazing animals is an effective way to preserve soil fertility. Many nutrients are recycled in crop cultivation by collecting animal manure from barns and concentrated feeding sites, sometimes after composting. For many areas with high livestock density, manure application substantially replaces the application of synthetic fertilizers on surrounding cropland. Manure is also spread on forage-producing land that is grazed, rather than cropped.

Also, small-ruminant flocks in North America (and elsewhere) are sometimes used on fields for removal of various crop residues inedible by humans, converting them to food. Small ruminants, such as sheep and goats, can control some invasive or noxious weeds (such as spotted knapweed, tansy ragwort, leafy spurge, yellow starthistle, tall larkspur, etc.) on rangeland. Small ruminants are also useful for vegetation management in forest plantations and for clearing brush on rights-of-way. Other ruminants, like Nublang cattle, are used in Bhutan to help remove a species of bamboo, Yushania microphylla, which tends to crowd out indigenous plant species. These represent alternatives to herbicide use.

=== Biodiversity ===
Biomass of mammals on Earth
1. Livestock, mostly cattle and pigs (60.0%)
2. Humans (36.0%)
3. Wild mammals (4.00%)

Meat production is considered one of the prime factors contributing to the current biodiversity loss crisis. The 2019 IPBES Global Assessment Report on Biodiversity and Ecosystem Services found that industrial agriculture and overfishing are the primary drivers of the extinction, with the meat and dairy industries having a substantial impact. The global livestock sector contributes a significant share to anthropogenic GHG emissions, but it can also deliver a significant share of the necessary mitigation effort. FAO estimates that the adoption of already available best practices can reduce emissions by up to 30%.

Grazing (especially overgrazing) may detrimentally affect certain wildlife species, e.g. by altering cover and food supplies. The growing demand for meat is contributing to significant biodiversity loss as it is a significant driver of deforestation and habitat destruction; species-rich habitats, such as significant portions of the Amazon region, are being converted to agriculture for meat production. World Resource Institute (WRI) website mentions that "30 percent of global forest cover has been cleared, while another 20 percent has been degraded. Most of the rest has been fragmented, leaving only about 15 percent intact." WRI also states that around the world there is "an estimated 1.5 billion hectares (3.7 billion acres) of once-productive croplands and pasturelands – an area nearly the size of Russia – are degraded. Restoring productivity can improve food supplies, water security, and the ability to fight climate change." Around 25% to nearly 40% of global land surface is being used for livestock farming. Livestock is, however, viewed as a tool for ecosystem restoration and biodiversity maintenance - especially in ecosystems with an evolutionary history of grazing mammals - if grazing practices are adequate for such purposes. Considering the large extent of grazing ecosystems, and the high former biomass of wild grazing herbivores in current ecosystems, this opens the door to the possibility of producing large amounts of meat in an environmentally sound way.

A 2017 World Wildlife Fund study found that 60% of biodiversity loss can be attributed to the vast scale of feed crop cultivation needed to rear tens of billions of farm animals, which puts enormous strain on natural resources, resulting in extensive loss of lands and species.

A 2022 report from World Animal Protection and the Center for Biological Diversity found that, based on 2018 data, some 235 million pounds (or 117,500 tons) of pesticides are used for animal feed purposes annually in the United States alone, in particular glyphosate and atrazine. The report emphasizes that 100,000 pounds of glyphosate has the potential to harm or kill some 93% of species listed under the Endangered Species Act. Atrazine, which is banned in 35 countries, could harm or kill at least 1,000 listed species. Both groups involved in the report advocate for consumers to reduce their consumption of animal products and to transition towards plant-based diets in order to reduce the growth of factory farming and protect endangered species of wildlife.

A 2023 study found that a vegan diet reduced wildlife destruction by 66%.

In North America, various studies have found that grazing sometimes improves habitat for elk, blacktailed prairie dogs, sage grouse, and mule deer. A survey of refuge managers on 123 National Wildlife Refuges in the US tallied 86 species of wildlife considered positively affected and 82 considered negatively affected by refuge cattle grazing or haying. The kind of grazing system employed (e.g. rest-rotation, deferred grazing, HILF grazing) is often important in achieving grazing benefits for particular wildlife species.

The biologists Rodolfo Dirzo, Gerardo Ceballos, and Paul R. Ehrlich write in an opinion piece for Philosophical Transactions of the Royal Society B that reductions in meat consumption "can translate not only into less heat, but also more space for biodiversity." They insist that it is the "massive planetary monopoly of industrial meat production that needs to be curbed" while respecting the cultural traditions of indigenous peoples, for whom meat is an important source of protein.

=== Aquatic ecosystems ===
Mean eutrophying emissions (water pollution by phosphates) of different foods per 100g of protein
Food type	Eutrophying emissions (g PO_{4}^{3-}eq per 100g protein)
Beef	301.4
Farmed Fish	235.1
Farmed Crustaceans	227.2
Cheese	98.4
Lamb and Mutton	97.1
Pork	76.4
Poultry	48.7
Eggs	21.8
Groundnuts	14.1
Peas	7.5
Tofu	6.2

Global agricultural practices are known to be one of the main reasons for environmental degradation. Animal agriculture worldwide encompasses 83% of farmland (but only accounts for 18% of the global calorie intake), and the direct consumption of animals as well as over-harvesting them is causing environmental degradation through habitat alteration, biodiversity loss, climate change, pollution, and trophic interactions. These pressures are enough to drive biodiversity loss in any habitat, however freshwater ecosystems are showing to be more sensitive and less protected than others and show a very high effect on biodiversity loss when faced with these impacts.

In the Western United States, many stream and riparian habitats have been negatively affected by livestock grazing. This has resulted in increased phosphates, nitrates, decreased dissolved oxygen, increased temperature, turbidity, and eutrophication events, and reduced species diversity. Livestock management options for riparian protection include salt and mineral placement, limiting seasonal access, use of alternative water sources, provision of "hardened" stream crossings, herding, and fencing. In the Eastern United States, a 1997 study found that waste release from pork farms has also been shown to cause large-scale eutrophication of bodies of water, including the Mississippi River and Atlantic Ocean (Palmquist, et al., 1997). In North Carolina, where the study was done, measures have since been taken to reduce the risk of accidental discharges from manure lagoons, and since then there has been evidence of improved environmental management in US hog production. Implementation of manure and wastewater management planning can help assure low risk of problematic discharge into aquatic systems.

In Central-Eastern Argentina, a 2017 study found large quantities of metal pollutants (chromium, copper, arsenic and lead) in their freshwater streams, disrupting the aquatic biota. The level of chromium in the freshwater systems exceeded 181.5× the recommended guidelines necessary for survival of aquatic life, while lead was 41.6×, copper was 57.5×, and arsenic exceeded 12.9×. The results showed excess metal accumulation due to agricultural runoff, the use of pesticides, and poor mitigation efforts to stop the excess runoff.

Animal agriculture contributes to global warming, which leads to ocean acidification. This occurs because as carbon emissions increase, a chemical reaction occurs between carbon dioxide in the atmosphere and ocean water, causing seawater acidification. The process is also known as the dissolution of inorganic carbon in seawater. This chemical reaction creates an environment that makes it difficult for calcifying organisms to produce protective shells and causes seagrass overpopulation. A reduction in marine life can have an adverse effect on people's way of life, since limited sea life may reduce food availability and reduce coastal protection against storms.

== Effects on antibiotic resistance ==
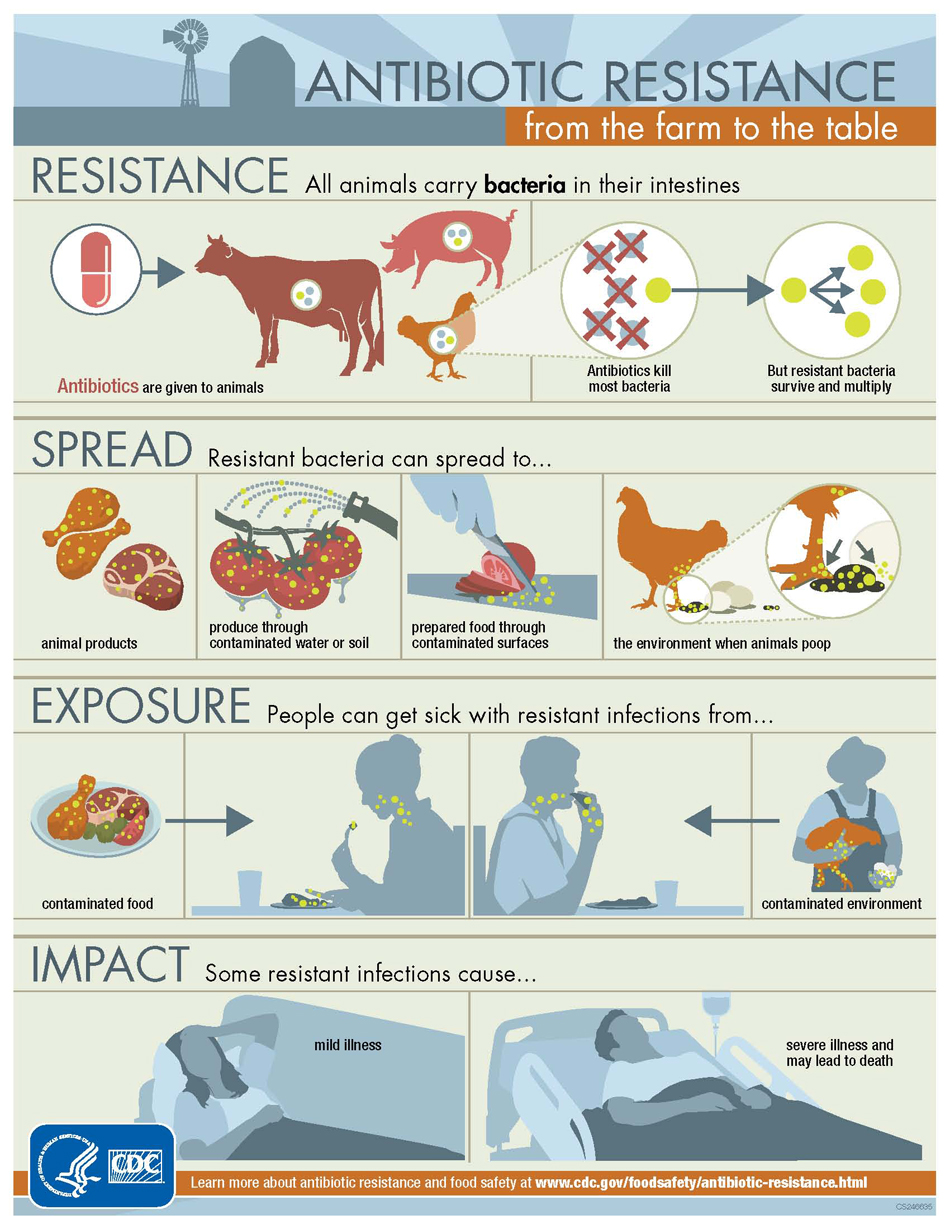
A CDC infographic on how antibiotic-resistant bacteria have the potential to spread from farm animals

The use of antibiotics in the husbandry of livestock includes treatment when ill (therapeutic), treatment of a group of animals when at least one is diagnosed with clinical infection (metaphylaxis), and preventative treatment (prophylaxis). Antibiotics are an important tool to treat animal as well as human disease, safeguard animal health and welfare, and support food safety. However, used irresponsibly, this may lead to antibiotic resistance which may impact human, animal and environmental health.

While levels of use vary dramatically from country to country, for example some Northern European countries use very low quantities to treat animals compared with humans, worldwide an estimated 73% of antimicrobials (mainly antibiotics) are consumed by farm animals. Furthermore, a 2015 study also estimates that global agricultural antibiotic usage will increase by 67% from 2010 to 2030, mainly from increases in use in developing BRIC countries.

Increased antibiotic use is a matter of concern as antibiotic resistance is considered to be a serious threat to human and animal welfare in the future, and growing levels of antibiotics or antibiotic-resistant bacteria in the environment could increase the numbers of drug-resistant infections in both. Bacterial diseases are a leading cause of death and a future without effective antibiotics would fundamentally change the way modern human as well as veterinary medicine is practised.

Legislation and other curbs on antibiotic use in farm animals are now being introduced across the globe. In 2017, the World Health Organization strongly suggested reducing antibiotic use in animals used in the food industry. The use of antibiotics for growth promotion purposes was banned in the European Union from 2006, and the use of sub-therapeutic doses of medically important antibiotics in animal feed and water to promote growth and improve feed efficiency became illegal in the United States on 1 January 2017, through regulatory change enacted by the Food and Drug Administration (FDA), which sought voluntary compliance from drug manufacturers to re-label their antibiotics.

There are concerns about meat production's potential to spread diseases as an environmental impact.

== Alternatives to meat production and consumption ==
A study shows that novel foods such as cultured meat and dairy, algae, existing microbial foods, and ground-up insects are shown to have the potential to reduce environmental impacts – by over 80%. Various combinations may further reduce the environmental impacts of these alternatives – for example, a study explored solar-energy-driven production of microbial foods from direct air capture. Alternatives are not only relevant for human consumption but also for pet food and other animal feed. Consumer acceptance of alternative protein sources varies significantly. A comprehensive review of 91 studies found that insect-based proteins ranked lowest in acceptance among meat substitutes, followed by cultured meat, while plant-based options achieved the highest acceptance rates.

=== Meat reduction and health ===
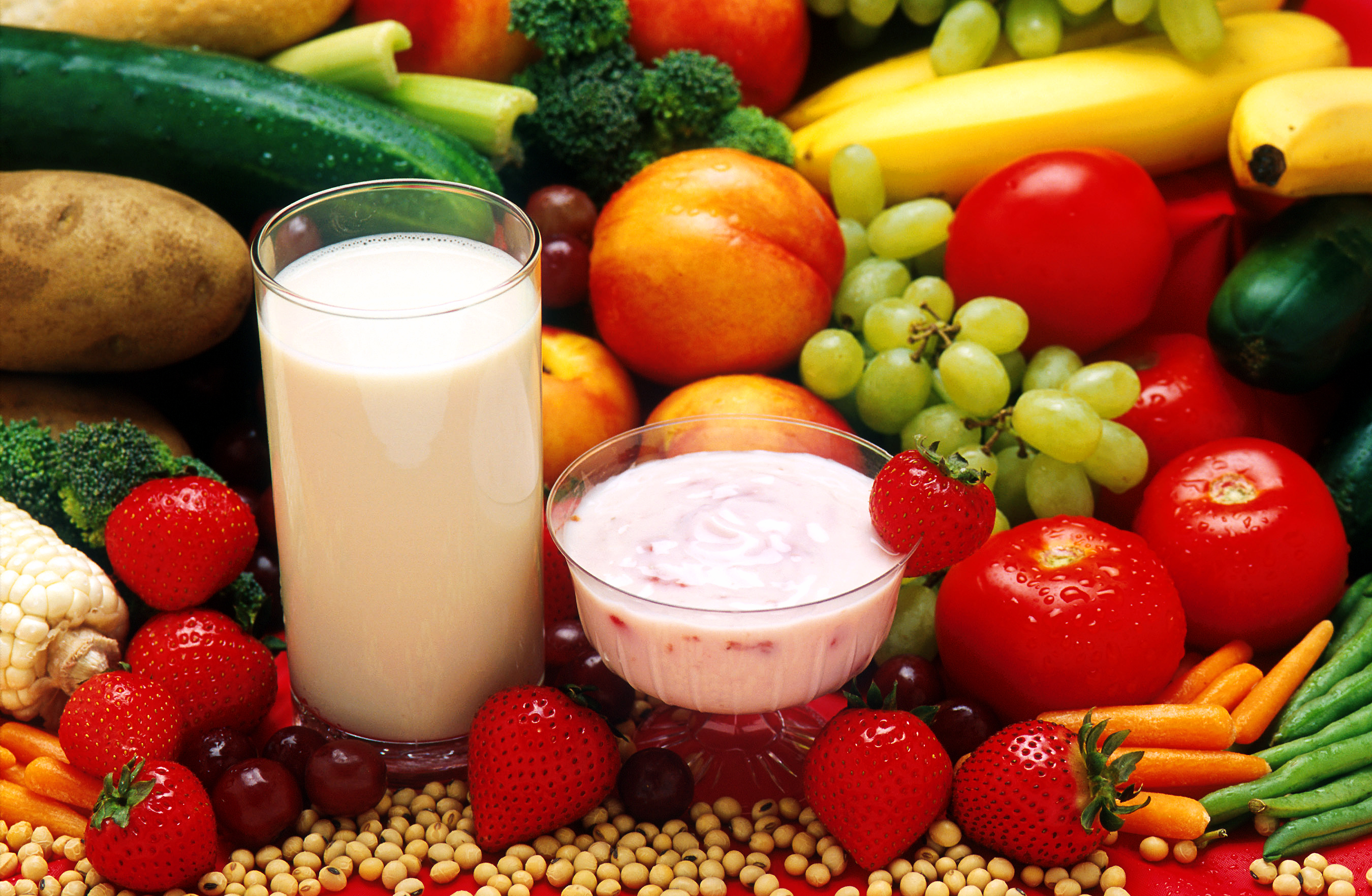
An insight to a vegetarian diet

With care, meat can be substituted in most diets with a wide variety of foods such as fungi or "meat substitutes". However, substantially reducing meat intake could result in nutritional deficiencies if done inadequately, especially for children, adolescents, and pregnant and lactating women "in low-income countries". A review suggests that the reduction of meat in people's diets should be accompanied by an increase in alternative sources of protein and micronutrients to avoid nutritional deficiencies for healthy diets such as iron and zinc. Meats notably also contain vitamin B_{12}, collagen and creatine. This could be achieved with specific types of foods such as iron-rich beans and a diverse variety of protein-rich foods like red lentils, plant-based protein powders and high-protein wraps, and/or dietary supplements. Dairy and fish and/or specific types of other foods and/or supplements contain omega 3, vitamin K_{2}, vitamin D_{3}, iodine, magnesium and calcium, many of which were generally lower in people consuming types of plant-based diets in studies, though meat-eaters were also shown to be at risk of nutritional deficits.

Nevertheless, observational studies find beneficial effects from plant-based diets (compared to consumption of meat products) on health and mortality rates. The consumption of red and processed meat is especially associated with health issues including increased risk of colorectal cancer, cardiovascular disease and type 2 diabetes. The U. S. Department of Health's 2015–2020 Dietary Guidelines for Americans recommend a reduction in meat, which is overconsumed among the American public, with a concomitant increase in the consumption of plant foods.

=== Meat-reduction strategies ===
We must change our diet. The planet can't support billions of meat-eaters.

— David Attenborough

Strategies for implementing meat-reduction among populations include large-scale education and awareness building to promote more sustainable consumption styles. Other types of policy interventions could accelerate these shifts and might include "restrictions or fiscal mechanisms such as meat taxes". In the case of fiscal mechanisms, these could be based on forms of scientific calculation of external costs (externalities currently not reflected in any way in the monetary price) to make the polluter pay, e.g. for the damage done by excess nitrogen. In the case of restrictions, this could be based on limited domestic supply or Personal (Carbon) Allowances (certificates and credits which would reward sustainable behavior).

Relevant to such a strategy, estimating the environmental impacts of food products in a standardized way – as has been done with a dataset of more than 57,000 food products in supermarkets – could also be used to inform consumers or in policy, making consumers more aware of the environmental impacts of animal-based products (or requiring them to take such into consideration).

Young adults that are faced with new physical or social environments (for example, moving away from home) are also more likely to make dietary changes and reduce their meat intake. Another strategy includes increasing the prices of meat while also reducing the prices of plant-based products, which could show a significant impact on meat-reduction.

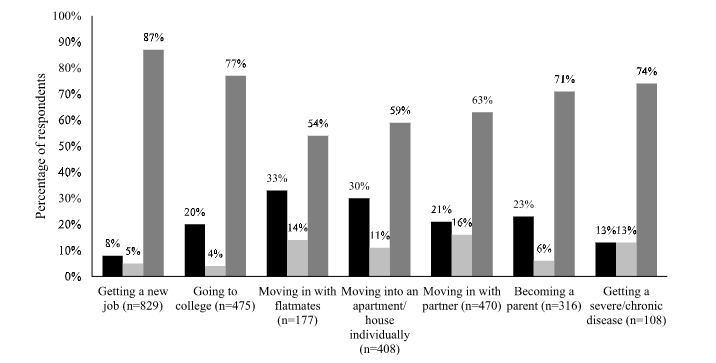
Meat reduction and increased plant-based preferences seen based on social and other life changes.

A reduction in meat portion sizes could potentially be more beneficial than cutting out meat entirely from ones diet, according to a 2022 study. This study revolved around young Dutch adults, and showed that the adults were more reluctant to cut out meat entirely to make the change to plant-based diets due to habitual behaviours. Increasing and improving plant-based alternatives, as well as the education about plant-based alternatives, proved to be one of the most effective ways to combat these behaviours. The lack of education about plant-based alternatives is a road-block for most people - most adults do not know how to properly cook plant-based meals or know the health risks/benefits associated with a vegetarian diet - which is why education among adults is important in meat-reduction strategies.

A July 2019 report by the World Resources Institute suggested that governments around the world should reduce subsidies for meat and dairy production while simultaneously increasing taxes on both, making these products more expensive. In the Netherlands, a meat tax of 15% to 30% could show a reduction of meat consumption by 8% to 16%. as well as reducing the amount of livestock by buying out farmers. In 2022, the city of Haarlem, Netherlands announced that advertisements for factory-farmed meat will be banned in public places, starting in 2024.

A 2022 review concluded that "low and moderate meat consumption levels are compatible with the climate targets and broader sustainable development, even for 10 billion people".

In June 2023, the European Commission's Scientific Advice Mechanism published a review of all available evidence and accompanying policy recommendations to promote sustainable food consumption and reducing meat intake. They reported that the evidence supports policy interventions on pricing (including "meat taxes, and pricing products according to their environmental impacts, as well as lower taxes on healthy and sustainable alternatives"), availability and visibility, food composition, labelling and the social environment. They also stated:

People choose food not just through rational reflection, but also based on many other factors: food availability, habits and routines, emotional and impulsive reactions, and their financial and social situation. So we should consider ways to unburden the consumer and make sustainable, healthy food an easy and affordable choice.

== By type of animal ==
=== Cattle ===
The production of cattle has a significant environmental impact, whether measured in terms of methane emissions, land use, consumption of water, discharge of pollutants, or eutrophication of waterways.

Estimated virtual water requirements for various foods (m^{3} water/ton)
	Hoekstra & Hung (2003)	Chapagain & Hoekstra (2003)	Zimmer & Renault (2003)	Oki et al. (2003)	Average
Beef		15,977	13,500	20,700	16,730
Pork		5,906	4,600	5,900	5,470
Cheese		5,288			5,290
Poultry		2,828	4,100	4,500	3,810
Eggs		4,657	2,700	3,200	3,520
Rice	2,656		1,400	3,600	2,550
Soybeans	2,300		2,750	2,500	2,520
Wheat	1,150		1,160	2,000	1,440
Maize	450		710	1,900	1,020
Milk		865	790	560	740
Potatoes	160		105		130

Mean land use of different foods
Food Types	Land Use (m^{2}·year per 100 g protein)
Lamb and Mutton	185
Beef	164
Cheese	41
Pork	11
Poultry	7.1
Eggs	5.7
Farmed Fish	3.7
Peanuts	3.5
Peas	3.4
Tofu	2.2

Significant numbers of dairy, as well as beef cattle, are confined in concentrated animal feeding operations (CAFOs), defined as "new and existing operations which stable or confine and feed or maintain for a total of 45 days or more in any 12-month period more than the number of animals specified" where "[c]rops, vegetation, forage growth, or post-harvest residues are not sustained in the normal growing season over any portion of the lot or facility." They may be designated as small, medium and large. Such designation of cattle CAFOs is according to cattle type (mature dairy cows, veal calves or other) and cattle numbers, but medium CAFOs are so designated only if they meet certain discharge criteria, and small CAFOs are designated only on a case-by-case basis.

A CAFO that discharges pollutants is required to obtain a permit, which requires a plan to manage nutrient runoff, manure, chemicals, contaminants, and other wastewater pursuant to the US Clean Water Act. The regulations involving CAFO permitting have been extensively litigated.

Commonly, CAFO wastewater and manure nutrients are applied to land at agronomic rates for use by forages or crops, and it is often assumed that various constituents of wastewater and manure, e.g. organic contaminants and pathogens, will be retained, inactivated or degraded on the land with application at such rates; however, additional evidence is needed to test reliability of such assumptions. Concerns raised by opponents of CAFOs have included risks of contaminated water due to feedlot runoff, soil erosion, human and animal exposure to toxic chemicals, development of antibiotic resistant bacteria and an increase in E. coli contamination. While research suggests some of these impacts can be mitigated by developing wastewater treatment systems and planting cover crops in larger setback zones, the Union of Concerned Scientists released a report in 2008 concluding that CAFOs are generally unsustainable and externalize costs.

Another concern is manure, which if not well-managed, can lead to adverse environmental consequences. However, manure also is a valuable source of nutrients and organic matter when used as a fertilizer. Manure was used as a fertilizer on about 6,400,000 hectares (15.8 million acres) of US cropland in 2006, with manure from cattle accounting for nearly 70% of manure applications to soybeans and about 80% or more of manure applications to corn, wheat, barley, oats and sorghum. Substitution of manure for synthetic fertilizers in crop production can be environmentally significant, as between 43 and 88 megajoules of fossil fuel energy would be used per kg of nitrogen in manufacture of synthetic nitrogenous fertilizers.

Grazing by cattle at low intensities can create a favourable environment for native herbs and forbs by mimicking the native grazers who they displaced; in many world regions, though, cattle are reducing biodiversity due to overgrazing. A survey of refuge managers on 123 National Wildlife Refuges in the US tallied 86 species of wildlife considered positively affected and 82 considered negatively affected by refuge cattle grazing or haying. Proper management of pastures, notably managed intensive rotational grazing and grazing at low intensities can lead to less use of fossil fuel energy, increased recapture of carbon dioxide, fewer ammonia emissions into the atmosphere, reduced soil erosion, better air quality, and less water pollution.

=== Pigs ===
The environmental impact of pig farming is mainly driven by the spread of feces and waste to surrounding neighborhoods, polluting air and water with toxic waste particles. Waste from pig farms can carry pathogens, bacteria (often antibiotic resistant), and heavy metals that can be toxic when ingested. Pig waste also contributes to groundwater pollution in the forms of groundwater seepage and waste spray into neighboring areas with sprinklers. The contents in the spray and waste drift have been shown to cause mucosal irritation, respiratory ailment, increased stress, decreased quality of life, and higher blood pressure. This form of waste disposal is an attempt for factory farms to be cost efficient. The environmental degradation resulting from pig farming presents an environmental injustice problem, since the communities do not receive any benefit from the operations, and instead, suffer negative externalities, such as pollution and health problems. The United States Agriculture and Consumer Health Department has stated that the main direct environmental impact of pig production is related to the manure produced.

== See also ==
- Agroecology
- Animal-free agriculture
- Animal–industrial complex
- Carbon tax
- Meat price
- Cultured meat
- Economic vegetarianism
- Factory farming divestment
- Environmental impact of agriculture
- Environmental impact of fishing
- Environmental vegetarianism
- Food vs. feed
- Stranded assets in the agriculture and forestry sector
- Sustainable agriculture
- Sustainable diet
- Veganism
