= Rural Municipality of Wolseley No. 155 =

Rural municipality in Saskatchewan, Canada

Wolseley No. 155
- Rural municipality
- Rural Municipality of Wolseley No. 155
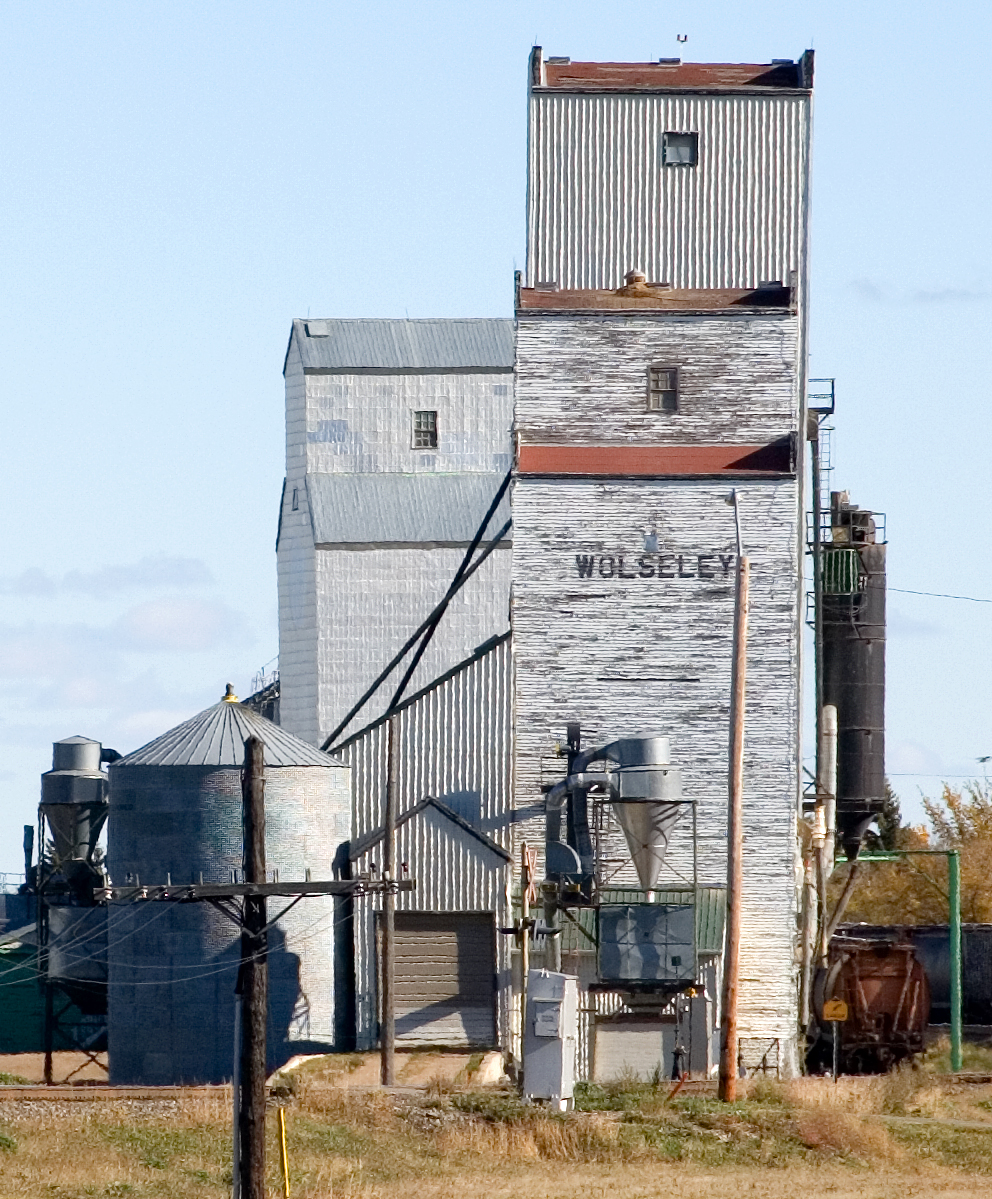
- Grain elevators in Wolseley

- Location of the RM of Wolseley No. 155 in Saskatchewan
- Coordinates: 50.518°N 103.173°W
- Country: Canada
- Province: Saskatchewan
- Census division: 5
- SARM division: 1
- Formed: December 13, 1909

Government
  - Reeve: Bev Kenny
  - Governing body: RM of Wolseley No. 155 Council
  - Administrator: Rose Zimmer
  - Office location: Wolseley

Area (2016)
  - Land: 774.26 km^{2} (298.94 sq mi)

Population (2016)
  - Total: 372
  - Density: 0.5/km^{2} (1.3/sq mi)
- Time zone: CST
  - Summer (DST): CST
- Area codes: 306 and 639

The Rural Municipality of Wolseley No. 155 (2016 population: 372) is a rural municipality (RM) in the Canadian province of Saskatchewan within Census Division No. 5 and SARM Division No. 1. it is located in the southeast portion of the province.

== History ==
The RM of Wolseley No. 155 incorporated as a rural municipality on December 13, 1909.

== Geography ==
Wolf Creek flows through the RM. The narrowleaf water plantain (alisma gramineum), tall larkspur (delphinium glaucum), and common butterwort (pinguicula vulgaris) are species of special concern in this area.

=== Communities and localities ===
The following urban municipalities are surrounded by the RM.

Towns

- Wolseley

The following unincorporated communities are within the RM.

Localities

- Adair
- Ellisboro
- Falcon
- Grainer
- Summerberry, dissolved as a village, December 31, 1972

== Demographics ==
Population history (1981–2016)
Year	Pop.	±%
1981	684	—
1986	632	−7.6%
1991	577	−8.7%
1996	549	−4.9%
2001	473	−13.8%
2006	438	−7.4%
2011	405	−7.5%
2016	372	−8.1%
Source: Statistics Canada via Saskatchewan Bureau of Statistics

In the 2021 Census of Population conducted by Statistics Canada, the RM of Wolseley No. 155 had a population of 366 living in 143 of its 166 total private dwellings, a change of −1.6% from its 2016 population of 372. With a land area of 758.46 km^{2} (292.84 sq mi), it had a population density of 0.5/km^{2} (1.2/sq mi) in 2021.

In the 2016 Census of Population, the RM of Wolseley No. 155 recorded a population of 372 living in 151 of its 178 total private dwellings, a −8.1% change from its 2011 population of 405. With a land area of 774.26 km^{2} (298.94 sq mi), it had a population density of 0.5/km^{2} (1.2/sq mi) in 2016.

== Government ==
The RM of Wolseley No. 155 is governed by an elected municipal council and an appointed administrator that meets on the third Monday of every month. The reeve of the RM is Bev Kenny while its administrator is Rose Zimmer. The RM's office is located in Wolseley.

== Transportation ==
Highway 1 (the Trans-Canada Highway) bisects the RM.

== See also ==
- List of rural municipalities in Saskatchewan
