= Sodbuster =

Sodbuster was a program created by Title 12 of the Food Security Act of 1985 designed to discourage the plowing up of erosion-prone grasslands for use as cropland. In congressional hearings for the Agriculture and Food Act of 1981, Idaho governor John Evans urged Congress strongly to enact legislation for sodbuster programs, in combination with a conservation reserve program. Sodbuster measures (to deny "certain Federal payments for converting fragile, highly erodible lands") were already discussed in the 98th United States Congress but were not passed. If such is used for crop production without proper conservation measures as laid out in a conservation plan, a producer may lose eligibility to participate in farm programs. In the 1990 Farm Bill, it was amended and became the super sodbuster, such that producers became ineligible for specified farm program benefits on all their land if they cultivated highly erodible land that was idle. The super sodbuster was repealed by the 1996 Farm Bill.
