= Environmental impact of pig farming =

Damages caused by pig farming to the environment

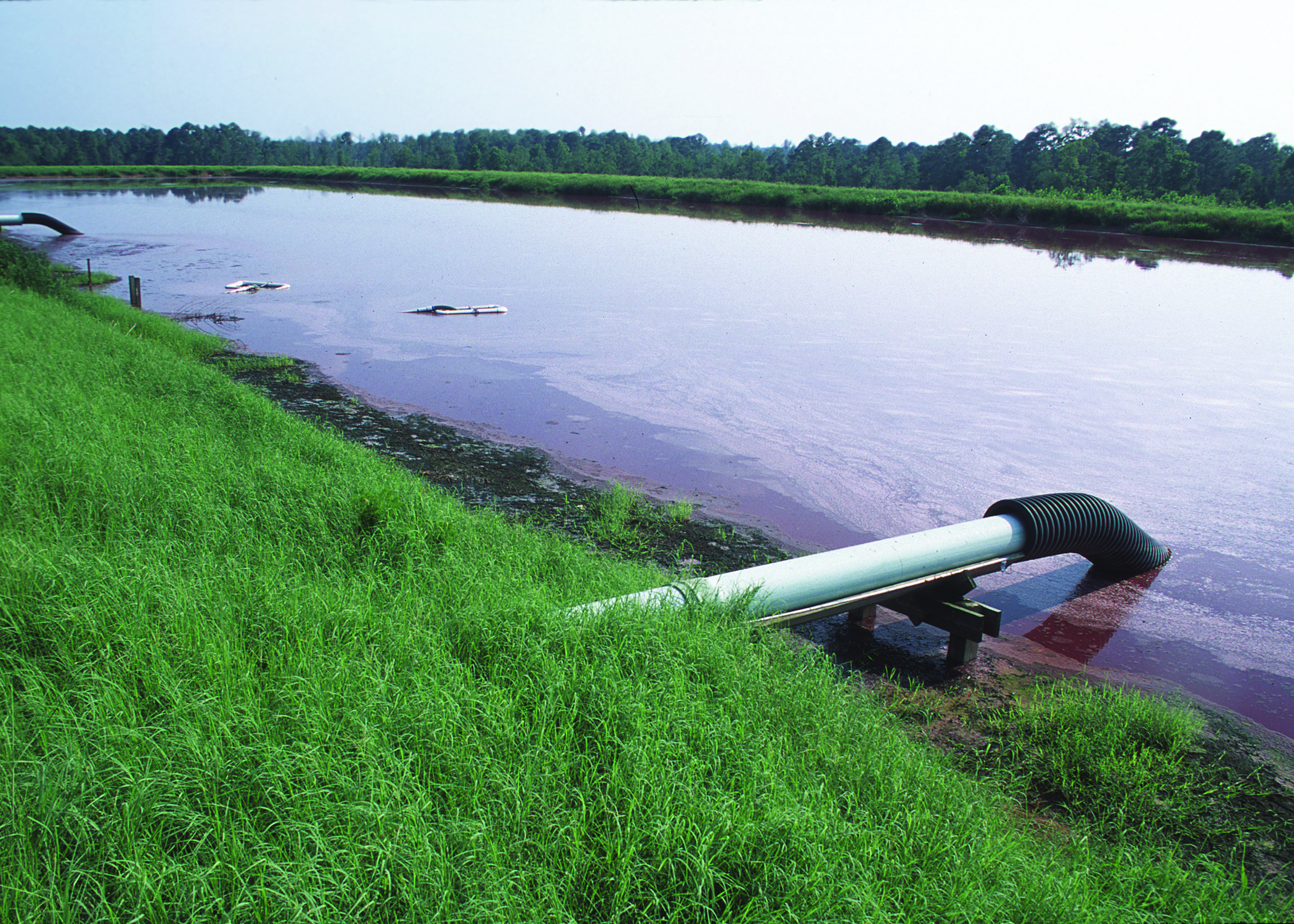
Farms often pump their animal waste directly into a large lagoon, which has environmental consequences.

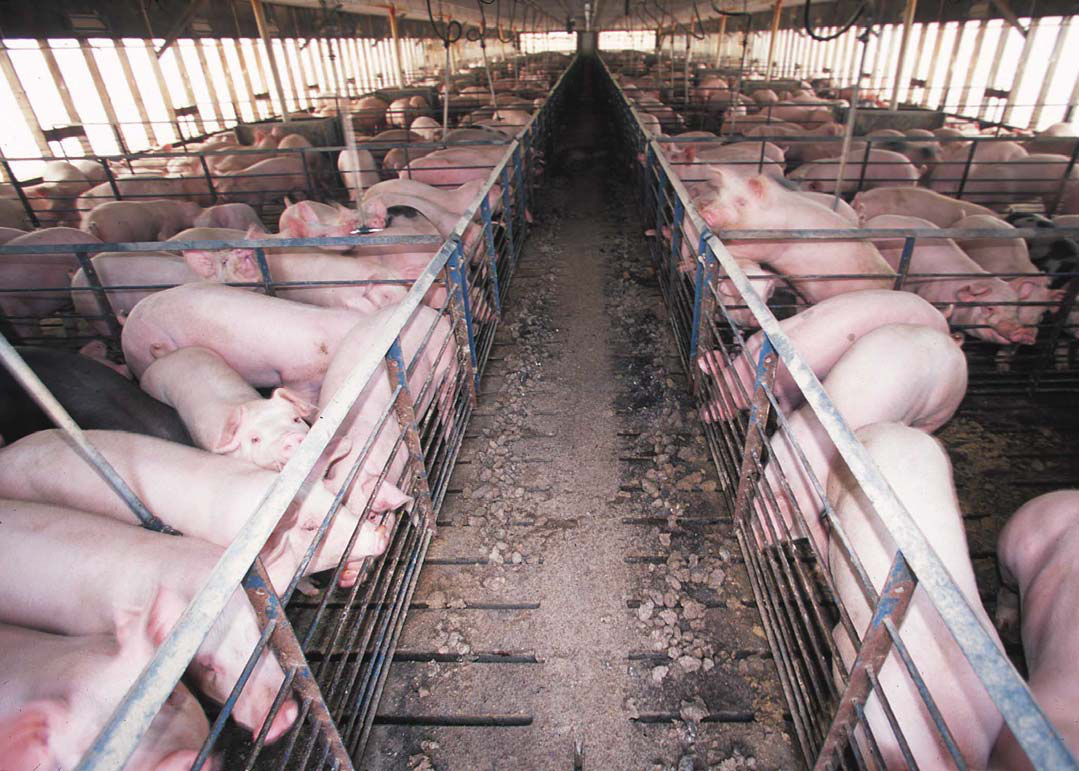
Pigs in intensive farming

The environmental impact of pig farming is mainly driven by the spread of animal waste to surrounding neighborhoods, polluting air and water with toxic waste particles. Waste from pig farms can carry pathogens, bacteria (often antibiotic resistant), and heavy metals that can be toxic when ingested. Pig waste also contributes to groundwater pollution through seepage into groundwater that is sprayed onto nearby areas. The substances in the spray and waste drift have been shown to cause mucosal irritation, respiratory ailment, increased stress, decreased quality of life, and higher blood pressure. This method of waste disposal is used by some factory farms to reduce cost. The environmental degradation resulting from pig farming presents an environmental injustice problem, since the communities do not receive any benefit from the operations, and instead, suffer negative externalities, such as pollution and health problems. The United States Agriculture and Consumer Health Department has stated that the main direct environmental impact of pig production is related to the manure produced.

== Effects on water quality ==
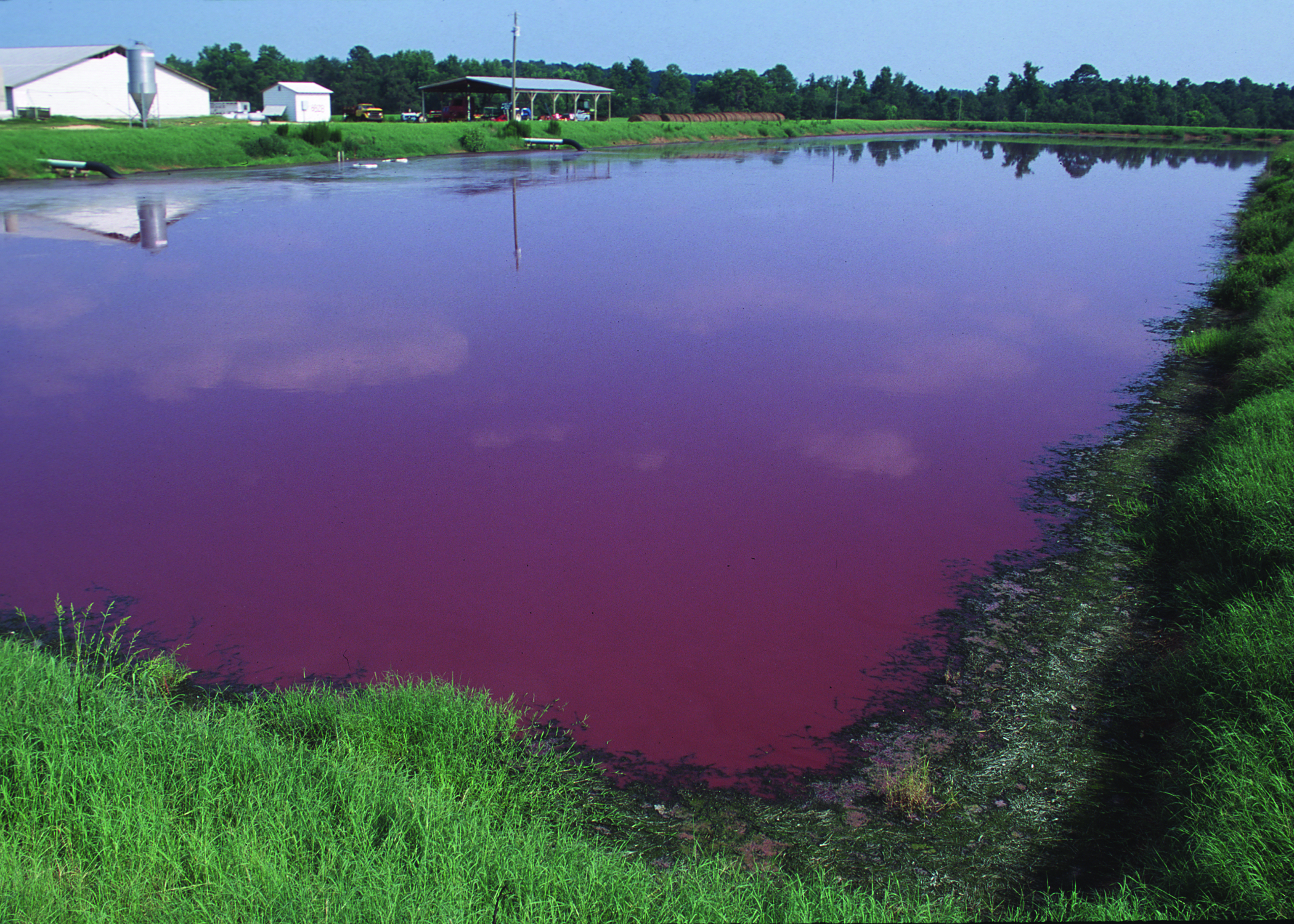
A typical waste lagoon in North Carolina.

Many intensive pig farms store the swine waste in vats often referred to as anaerobic lagoons. These lagoons often contain pathogens such as salmonella, pharmaceuticals like antibiotics and antimicrobials, as well as nitrogen and phosphorus. This can lead to widespread pollution within the watershed the farm is located within, if the water from these lagoons leaches out into the soil and trickles down into the water table beneath. Unlike human sewage, which is always treated with chemical and mechanical filtration, the waste from these lagoons is untreated when it is released back to the environment. Spills are the most common contributor to pollution, but regardless of spills, toxic nutrients like nitrates and ammonia can seep into the water table located just below the surface, infecting the groundwater that nearby communities drink. It has been estimated that 35,000 miles of river across over 20 states have been contaminated by manure leakage. Some of the causes for the environmental problems are inadequate sewage treatment and lack of available treatment technologies. Many farms lack adequate wastewater treatment systems, which can lead to untreated waste water entering the environment.

Some spills and leakage of contaminated waste are not accidental. In 2014, Mark Devries, a documentary filmmaker, used spy drones to expose pig farms in North Carolina that were spraying untreated fecal waste into the surrounding areas, allowing the waste to dissipate into far-off communities. Smithfield Foods, the company responsible for one such factory, claimed this was a tactic used to fertilize its fields. It is true that historically hog feces have been used as fertilizer and can be done safely and without runoff, but the magnitude was described by Dan Whittle, a former senior policy associate at the North Carolina Department of Environment and Natural Resources, as a "mass imbalance", with far too great a magnitude of fecal matter being sprayed for the crops being generated to not have significant spill off into neighboring plots of land.

== Effects on air quality ==
Communities located near factory pig farms experience negative health and environmental effects due to several factors associated with industrial pig farming. One main issue that arises out of intensive animal agriculture is the waste that the huge number of animals produce. Pig waste, like human waste, can contain bacteria and high levels of ammonia. At most intensive pig farms, hog waste is kept in large open-air pits called lagoons where waste is broken down by anaerobic bacteria and then sprayed onto crops as fertilizer. This is called the lagoon and sprayfield system and remains legal in the United States, including in states like North Carolina where there have been ongoing efforts in the NC legislature to ban open-air lagoon-and-sprayfield practices in the state and replace these with more environmentally sound waste management practices.

The waste then reaches neighboring towns, residents in these nearby towns tend to experience odors and other harmful effects in the air from the pig waste in the air. People living in nearby towns have suffered a variety of adverse health effects including respiratory diseases, infections, increased risk of cancer, and other health risks.

The nitrogen from pig waste can also contribute to acid rain in the local areas; a team of scientists from the USDA Agricultural Research Service (ARS) and the US Environmental Protection Agency (EPA) has examined and noted that within wastewater lagoons in North and South Carolina, there are a host of genes involved in the process of turning ammonia into nitrogen.

A case study published in Environmental Health Perspectives, sought to prove that malodor and pollutant concentrations from swine operations are associated with stress, altered mood, and increased blood pressure. For two weeks, adult volunteers living near swine operations in North Carolina sat outside for ten minutes twice a day. They reported levels of hog odor, and recorded their blood pressure. The study found that like noise and other similar environmental stressors, the malodors from the swine operations were likely associated with an increase in blood pressure, which could contribute to an increase in chronic hypertension.

== Disease spread ==
Disease outbreaks occurring have been associated with the presence of pig farming, particularly industrial pig farming in a given community. Methicillin-resistant Staphylococcus aureus (MRSA), an antibiotic-resistant bacteria, have been correlated to individuals working in a pig farm. One study found an association between working on a farm and MRSA. The researchers suggested that this association could be linked to the exposure to pigs on the farm that were present with MRSA.

A population-based study completed compared the health of the workers that work on a conventional farm versus antibiotic-free farms. In this study they would test around 0 to 28 workers per farm for the MRSA infection. They found that of the workers tested, 31 tested positive for MRSA and 27 of those workers were on farms where MRSA was found amongst the swine they worked with. These results can suggest an association between working on farms where pigs carry MRSA and workers testing positive for bacterium.

Hepatitis E Virus (HEV), is a virus that is the agent for the Hepatitis E, has also been shown to have an association with pigs. There was a study completed by a group of scientists published in Italy that tested how farms are linked to pig HEV antibodies. In this study the researchers found that 97% of the farms tested positive for HEV antibodies. They also found that 50% of the swine tested positive for the HEV antibodies.

Other diseases can also spread in pig farms such as Salmonella, Toxoplasma, and Campylobacter. Doing things such as washing hands and clothes, wearing face masks, and covering any open wounds when coming into contact with pigs can help prevent the possible spread of these diseases. Improvements in farmer education about diseases are often cited as the reason for the lack of increase in disease outbreaks in North Carolina despite an increase in pig population by a factor of four in the years leading up to 1998.

== Around the world ==
=== Australia ===
Australia is home to one of the largest pork industries in the world with farms across Australia collectively containing over 300,000 pigs but there are high levels of water pollution. While clean drinking water is essential to the growth and development of pigs, high levels of hard minerals and water-borne pathogens have been found in many of Australia's pig farms. Poor water management poses a threat to the well-being and performance of pig production.

=== China ===
Pork is the most popular meat in China. Intensive pig farming leads to smog and water pollution in some Chinese regions. According to the Chinese Ministry of Agriculture, livestock farming is the leading cause of water pollution in the country.

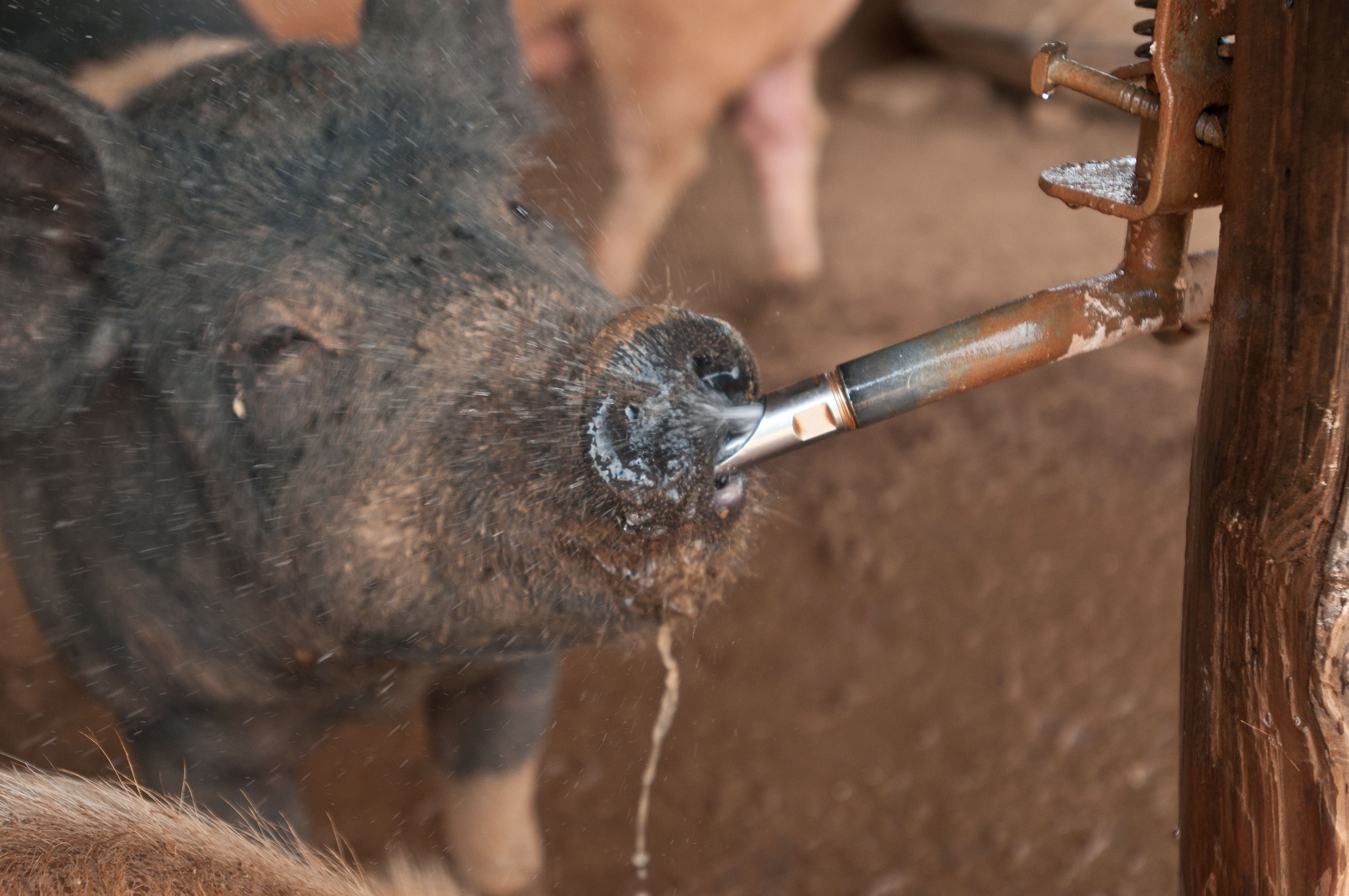
A pig drinking water on a farm.

In Hong Kong, a study was done on farmers to identify key barriers and challenges associated with pig farming in that area. The farmers revealed that the biggest obstacle for improvement of pig husbandry practices was impeded by outdated government regulations.

=== France ===
Swine farm manure leads to toxic algal blooms in the French region of Brittany. Industrial pig farming has become a common practice for producing pork in the country of France. However, the local community of consumers has become skeptical of intensive industrial pig production. Safety factors, quality of meat and impacts on the environment are all reasons for the decrease of pig farming production throughout France. Organic methods for raising swine has enticed 23% of producers and a majority of the consumers support this.

=== Netherlands ===
The Netherlands has one of the densest livestock sectors in the world. In 2019, a Dutch court halted the expansion of pig and other farms to prevent nitrogen pollution, which had led to algal blooms, smog, and soil acidification.

=== United States ===
The United States Environmental Protection Agency (EPA) calls intensive farms above a certain threshold concentrated animal feeding operations (CAFOs).

In the 1970s, a series of laws, known as "Murphy's Laws", were passed in North Carolina to eliminate the sales tax on hog farm equipment and to prevent authorities from using authority to prevent and address odor issues. After the passage of Murphy's Laws and other similar bills, there was a rapid increase in industry in North Carolina, where the population of swine was estimated around 9-10 million. Each of those hogs produces eight times the feces as a human, causing a crucial need for regulation and maintenance for that waste.

Regulation and laws could not keep up with the rapid explosion of the hog farming and spread of CAFOs in the early 2000s, which has caused severe harm and health impacts over time. Furthermore, agencies with jurisdiction over CAFOs are typically environmental or natural resource state-run agencies, as opposed to local health departments. This is an advantage for addressing environmental impacts but a disadvantage for human health concerns, as the majority of local health issues get overlooked by state-run agencies. Additionally, although there are laws and regulations in place, such as the Swine Farm Environmental Performance Standards Act, which prohibits new waste lagoons and mandates that new CAFOs must use technology that will prevent discharge of waste, these regulations do not mandate for existing CAFOs to clean up or regulate the pollutants within their lagoons. These regulations also make it more costly to clean up these wastes and prevent other consequential harms, without actually assisting farms in shouldering these costs, making it difficult for them to actually act on these regulations.

Ag-gag laws have made it even more difficult for farms to be held accountable for their actions, and for communities to have a transparent view of farm operations. These laws forbid the undercover video-taping or documenting of farms without the consent of the farm's owner. These laws are targeted at keeping animal rights and environmental activists away from the most damaging farm operations. These laws emerged in the 90's and are now in effect in North Carolina, Utah, Missouri, Idaho, and Iowa, and is being considered in at least five states. These bills have the potential to exacerbate animal abuse on these large scale farms and CAFOs, as well as threaten community health, social justice, and consumer health by restricting organizations and individuals from sharing pertinent information about the food supply.

The EPA does require that operations with qualified number of pigs must demonstrate that there is no runoff from their farm, in order for them to acquire a permit. But, this regulation varies from state to state and most of the time, enforcement only happens in response to citizen complaints, rather than active monitoring. Further, locally developed policies often have inefficient resources and abilities to enforce regulation, and often don't address transboundary issues that arise with pig operations that exist across multiple states. And with Federal laws such as the Clean Water and Clean Air act, regulation is delegated to state agencies, but these agencies don't usually take on active regulation until the damage has been done. Further, many operations are exempt because they have been grandfathered in, meaning they have been in operation for so long that they are not subject to the new laws.

==== North Carolina ====
In 2014, National Geographic wrote a piece on the extent of the contamination in North Carolina. Swine sales in the state (second largest pork producer in the nation) were nearly $3 billion in 2012, and the state received attention in 1999 when Hurricane Floyd caused waste pods on the swine ponds to overflow, polluting the water supply. National Geographic suggested that despite the execution of a $17 million research project on waste in the area, no one in the state seemed to know what to do with the pig waste, which was a huge issue considering that there are nearly as many pigs as people. Nearly two decades later when Hurricane Florence hit the coast of North Carolina in 2018, hog waste remained a major concern. According to the NC Pork Council, 98% of hog lagoons experienced minimal impact. The NC Department of Environmental Quality identified six hog farms with anaerobic lagoons that suffered structural damage and 28 farms that had lagoons overflow due to the floodwater.

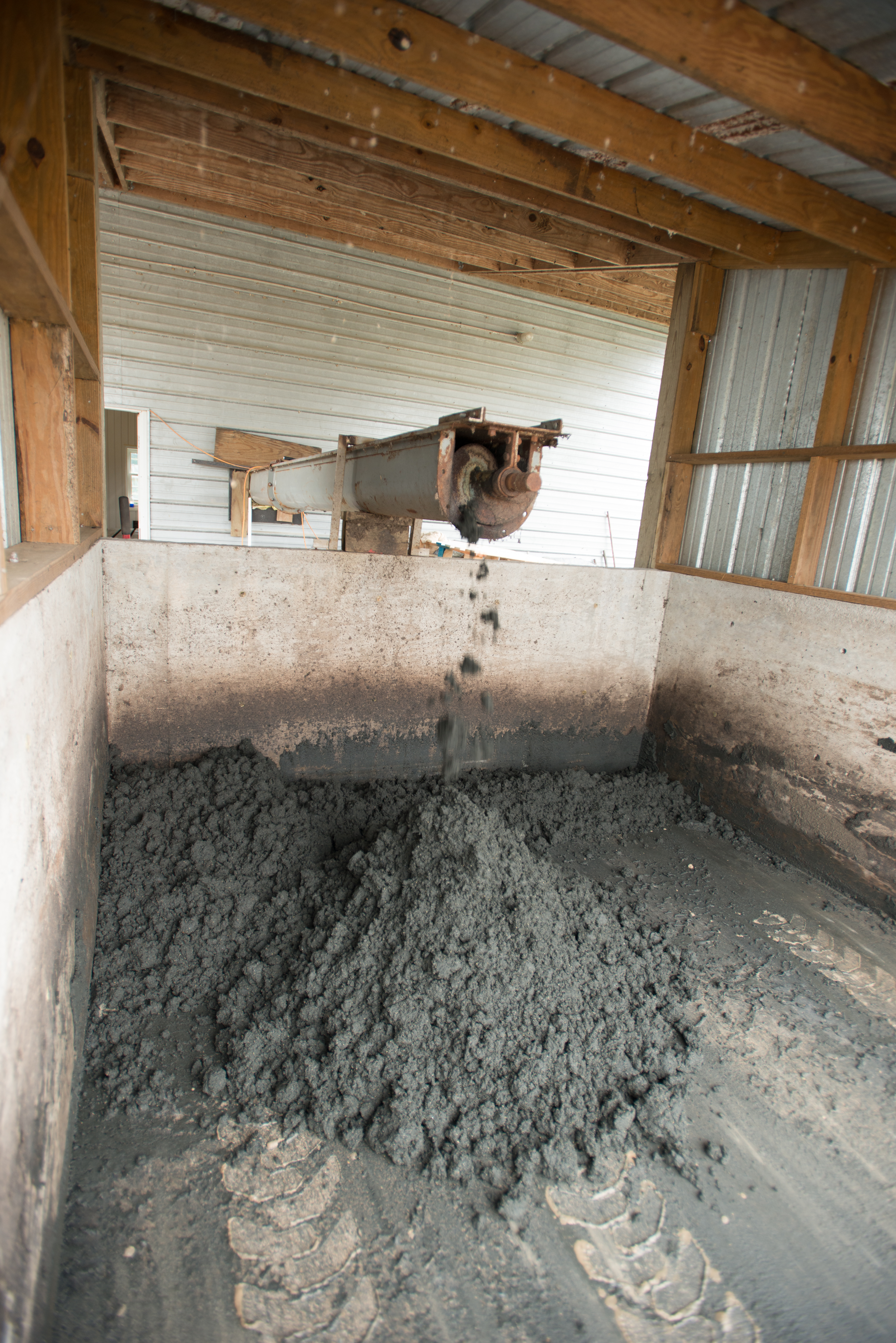
An auger tool used on a swine farm to separate liquids, solids, and gasses from manure.

Social justice concerns regarding agricultural lands in rural areas have been rising because of the way minority communities are disproportionally affected by hazards and health risks associated with pig farming. Due to the immense amount of waste produced by pigs, often foul odors and airborne molecules disturb local citizens. There is an unfair distribution of these swine farms, where around 90% are located along the "black-belt", which is known for its previous production of cotton and tobacco farming. Many of the minority farmers are being put out of business because of concentrated animal feeding operations (factory farms). Staggering statistics show that compared to white-owned farms, black-owned farms have declined by 98% and there are only about 18,000 today. Furthermore, environmental justice activists have described the apparent linkage between air pollution and toxic hazards with the demographic of suburban communities that show black and low-income communities being the main targets.

==== Improvements to pig farming practices ====
Due to the many environmental repercussions associated with common pig farming techniques, new technologies were created and tested to help prevent these problems. Manure from swine contains excess nitrogen and phosphorus which gets released into nearby water bodies, polluting streams and rivers and contributing to eutrophication. In order to combat this issue, scientists in North Carolina have tested treatment technologies that are designed to separate the manure. Once the pigs drop their manure, a screening device can be used to separate the solid particles from the liquids. A filtration process can be even more effective with removing extra nitrogen and phosphorus that is still remaining. A filter cloth can catch any remaining particles with a pore size less than an inch. Applying this method can greatly reduce organic matters that come from manure which end up in near-by waterways causing pollution and eutrophication.

Another more unconventional way to solve the solution the effects of large Industrial farming is possibly promoting more smaller or medium sized farms. Now I know this may be a challenging thing to do since the Industrial Pig farming has grown to be such a huge industry. Though promoting smaller farms can result in many benefit such as less waste being inputed into the environment and higher quality meat production. In an article a group of scientist found that the smaller farms allowed for less impact to occur on the environment than the large Industrial farms. The study also shows how the smaller farms can result in not only environmental benefits but also economic benefits. This study shows how small pig farming is not only beneficial for the environment but for us as well.

== In popular culture ==
In The Simpsons Movie, Homer Simpson dumps a silo of pig manure into a lake near the town of Springfield, provoking an environmental catastrophe that leads the US Environmental Protection Agency (EPA) to quarantine Springfield with a giant glass dome.

== See also ==
- Cultured meat
- Environmental impact of meat production
- Environmental impact of fishing
