= Summerberry =

Coordinates: 50.4250°N 103.0936°W

Summerberry is an organized hamlet in the Rural Municipality of Wolseley No. 155, Saskatchewan, Canada that previously held village status until December 31, 1972. It is located between the towns of Wolseley and Grenfell on Highway 1 (the Trans-Canada Highway), 15 km east of Wolseley.

== History ==
Summerberry was originally incorporated as a village. It was restructured as an organized hamlet under the jurisdiction of the Rural Municipality of Wolseley No. 155 on December 31, 1972.

Summerberry was named after the nearby creek which is surrounded by saskatoon bushes. Summerberry is an alternate name for the saskatoon.

Stone School - the two-story stone school in Summerberry was built in 1907/08. It is made from local field stones and bricks from Manitoba Stephens Brick Company Ltd. It was designed by Architect Victor M. Horwood of Winnipeg, Manitoba. It employed two teachers grade 1 to 12. It was in use till 1966 when students were then bused to the Wolseley's schools.

Post Office - the first post office was established October 1, 1884. Early postmasters were:

- John Love - October 1, 1884 to March 11, 1886
- James H. Love - July 1, 1886 to May 9, 1889
- Miss Bertha M. Linnell - July 1, 1889 to April 2, 1891
- William Linnell - June 1, 1891 to May 25, 1946

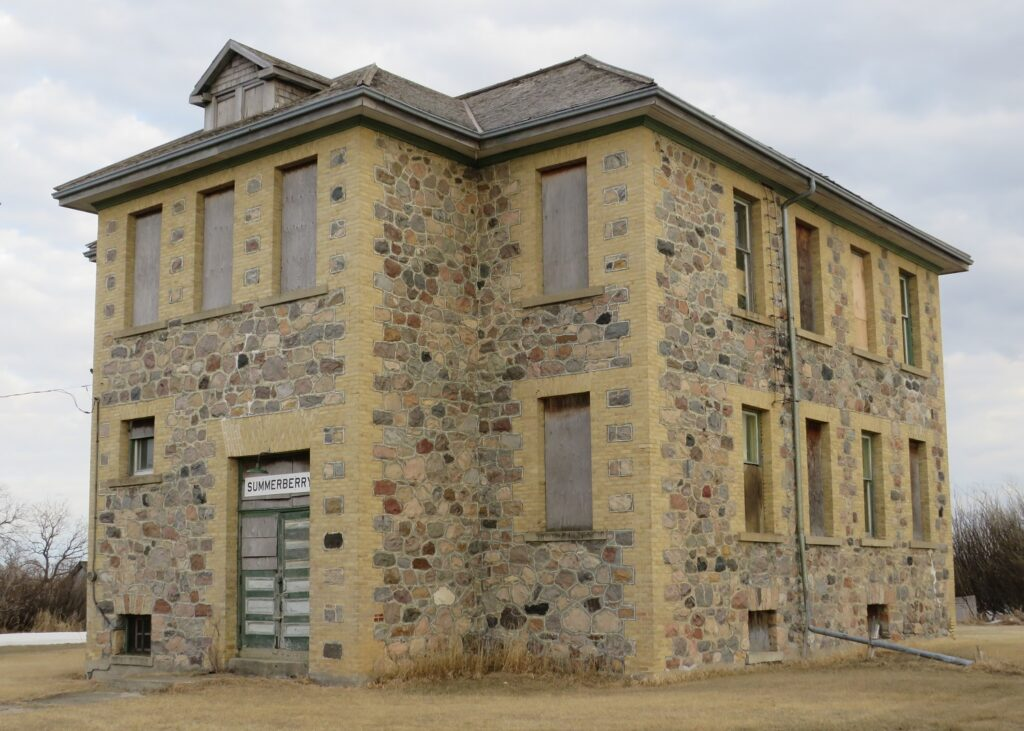
Stone school in Summerberry

== See also ==
- List of communities in Saskatchewan
