= Highly erodible land =

In United States agricultural policy, Highly erodible land (HEL) refers to land that is very susceptible to erosion, including fields that have at least 1/3 or 50 acres (200,000 m^{2}) of soils with a natural erosion potential of at least 8 times their T value. About 101 million acres (410,000 km^{2}) of cropland meet this definition of HEL, according to the 1997 National Resources Inventory. Farms cropping highly erodible land and under production flexibility contracts must be in compliance with a conservation plan that protects this cropland.

== See also ==
- Tillage erosion
