= Soil loss tolerance =

Soil loss tolerance for a specific soil, also known as the T value, is the maximum average annual soil loss expressed as tons per acre per year that will permit current production levels to be maintained economically and indefinitely. It is calculated with the formula $T=\upsilon Q \rho C +R(1-C)$. T values range from 1 to 5 tons per acre per year. According to the United States Department of Agriculture's National Resource Conservation Service, in 2007 in the US, 99 million acres (28% of all cropland) were eroding above soil loss tolerance (T) rates. This was compared to 169 million acres (40% of cropland) in 1982. T-value's validity is questionable since T-values are spatially heterogeneous.

== History ==
=== In the United States ===
The idea of soil loss tolerance was initially devised by the Soil Conservation Service (known presently as the NRCS). It is based on the minimum soil loss rate required to reduce organic content and harm crop productivity in agricultural contexts. In early stages of development, soil loss tolerance rates were inconsistent because they were obtained based on rough estimates. From 1961 to 1962, several groups of soil in the United States were designated with T values ranging from 2 to 6 tons per acre per year. The rate was subsequently adjusted to 1 to 5 tons per acre per year. The value was adapted for use in conservation management beginning in the mid-1960s.

== Validity ==
The soil loss tolerance equation may not be universally applicable, especially in regions with high amounts of soluble carbonate minerals, such as Karst formations. It is argued that T values should not be the only factor considered, and that real soil loss and the ratio between real loss and soil loss tolerance should be used to accurately assess the risk that soil loss poses. T values are also spatially heterogeneous, meaning that a single T value given to a region may not reflect the diversity of soil characteristics present, and may misrepresent erosion risks in certain areas.
