= Tall larkspur =

Tall larkspur is a common name for several flowering plants and may refer to:

- Delphinium barbeyi, native to the western United States
- Delphinium exaltatum, native to the eastern United States
