= Intensive pig farming =

Method of animal husbandry

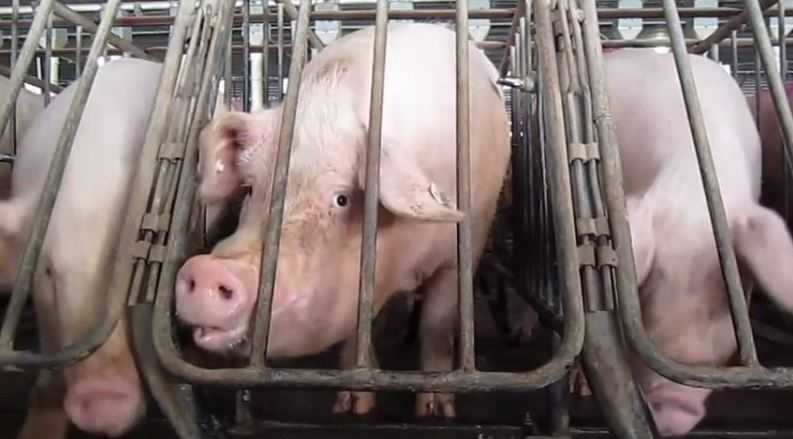
Gestation crates are one of the typical characteristics of intensive pig farming.

Intensive pig farming, also known as pig factory farming, is a system of pig production in which pigs are raised indoors at high density under controlled environmental conditions. It has become the dominant method of commercial pork production in most industrialized countries, though traditional systems remain significant in many parts of the world. Typical facilities, sometimes called piggeries, house pigs raised for slaughter in group pens on slatted floors made of concrete, with a manure pit beneath the floor. Breeding sows are kept in gestation crates or in group housing during pregnancy, and moved to farrowing crates to give birth and nurse piglets. The waste falling through the slats is sometimes transferred to manure lagoons.

The system developed over the second half of the 20th century. Features include purpose-built indoor facilities with mechanical ventilation and climate control; specialized genetic lines selected for fast growth, large litter sizes, and feed efficiency; the use of formulated diets heavier in grain than previous practice and with nutrients tailored for each life stage; and routine use of vaccines and antibiotics to manage disease. The new system replaced the mixed outdoor and barnyard operations that had previously dominated. These changes produced substantial gains in feed conversion ratio and growth rate, while requiring fewer human staff per pig. These gains have supported a large expansion in global pork production. Production also became more concentrated, with smallholder farms declining and a growing share of output coming from a smaller number of large operations.

Piglets are usually separated from their mother around 3 weeks old, an earlier weaning than in traditional agriculture, and their diet switched from the sow's milk to solid feed. Other standard practices include tail docking, teeth clipping or grinding, and the surgical castration of male piglets, often performed without anesthesia. Producers cite injury prevention, disease control, and labor efficiency as rationales. These practices, along with close confinement of sows, have drawn sustained criticism from animal welfare researchers and advocacy groups. The European Union restricts the use of gestation crates to the first four weeks of pregnancy, and several U.S. states, including California and Massachusetts, have passed laws limiting confinement of breeding sows. Most other states of the United States permit broader use of crates, as do other major producers including China, Brazil, and Mexico.

Because intensive operations concentrate large numbers of animals and their manure in small areas, they are associated with more acute environmental impacts from pig farming than traditional pig farming, including water pollution from nutrient runoff and air pollution from ammonia released by manure storage. The routine use of antibiotics in intensive systems has also been linked to the spread of antibiotic-resistant bacteria that can infect humans. The high density of genetically similar animals raises concerns about the potential amplification of zoonotic diseases such as swine influenza ("swine flu").

== Description ==
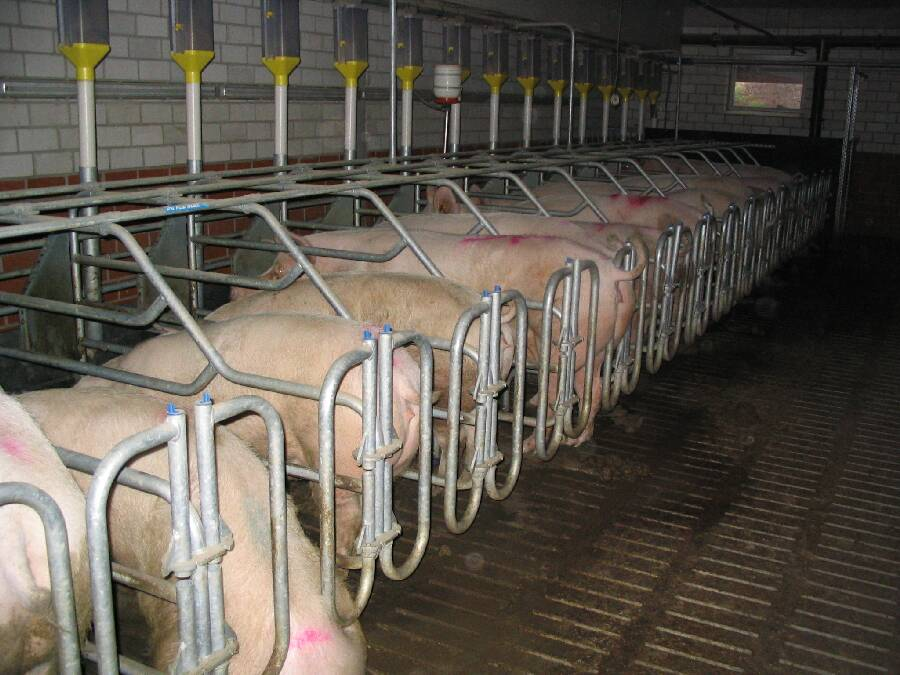
Sows in gestation crates

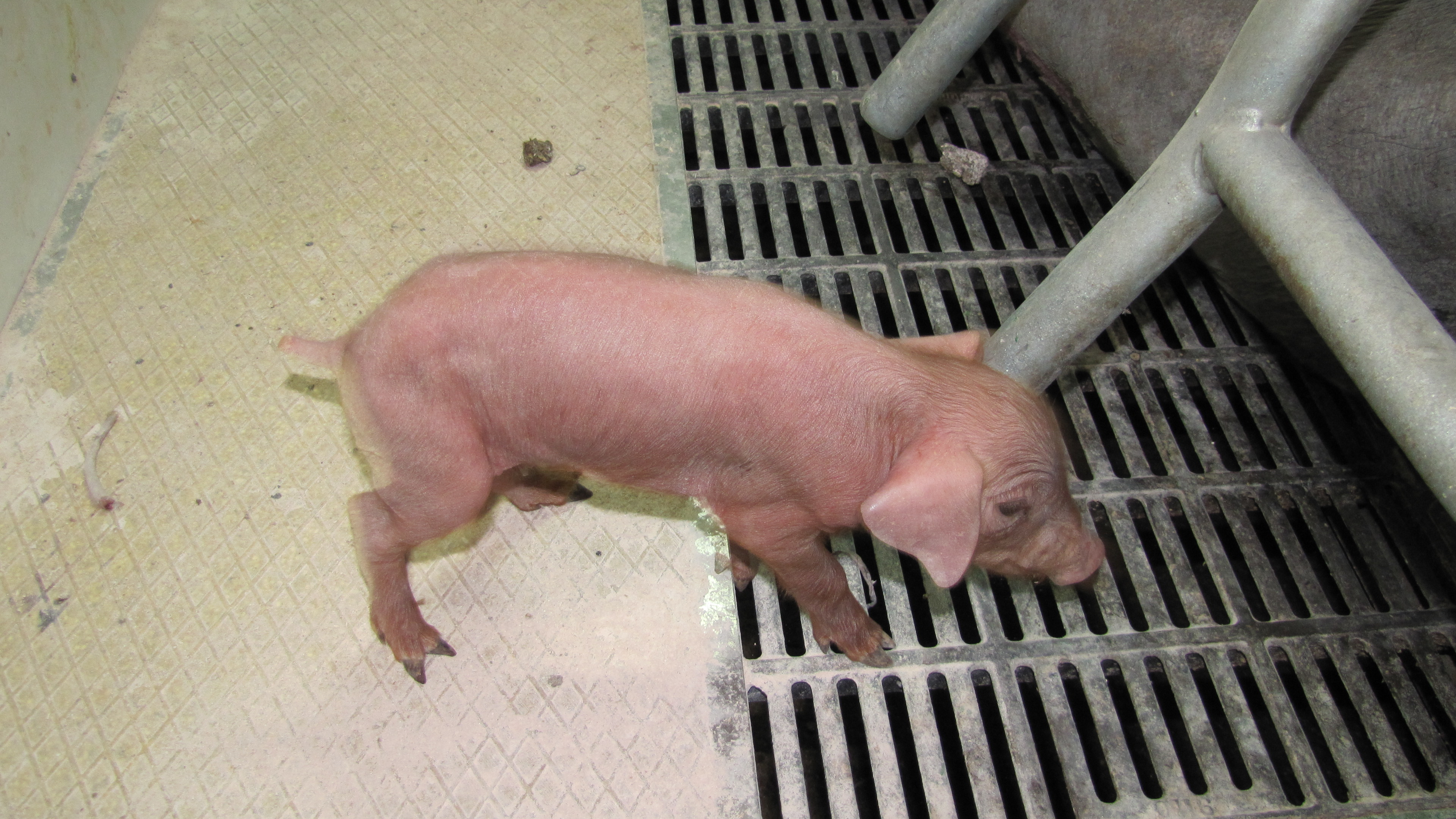
A young piglet. Note the dismembered tail to the left.

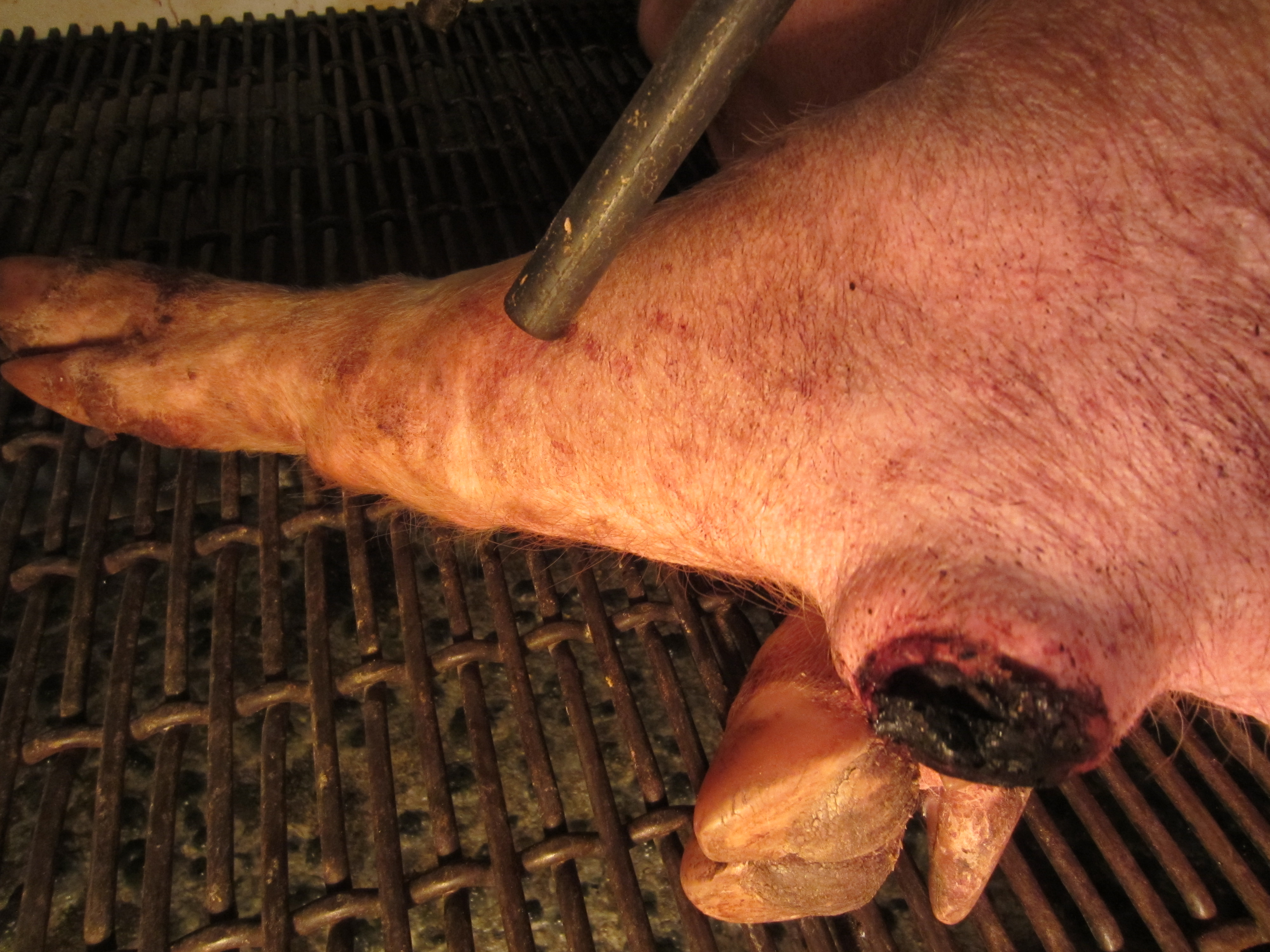
The result of tail docking a piglet

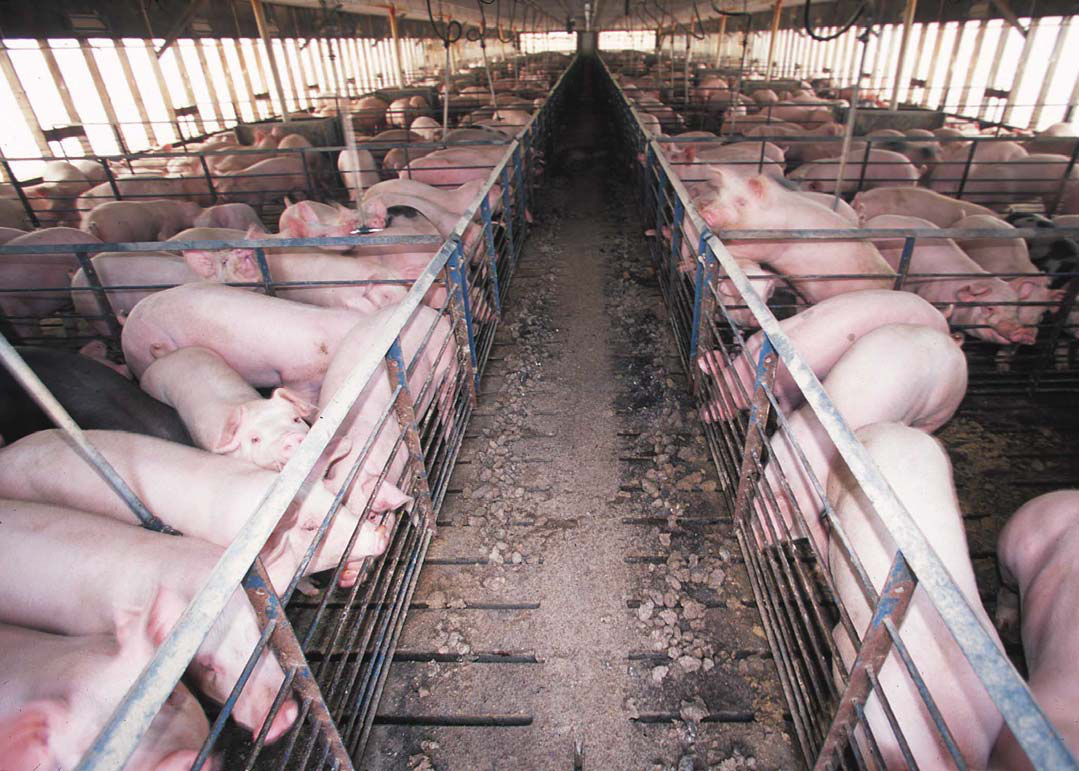
Indoor group pens. Note the slatted floor designed for waste removal.

Intensive piggeries are generally large warehouse-like buildings or barns with little exposure to sunlight or the outdoors. Most pigs are officially entitled to less than one square meter of space each. Indoor pig systems allow many more pigs to be monitored than historical methods, ensuring lowered cost, and increased productivity. Buildings are ventilated and their temperature regulated.

Most domestic pig varieties are susceptible to sunburn and heat stress, and all pigs lack sweat glands and cannot cool themselves. Pigs have a limited tolerance to high temperatures and heat stress can lead to death. Maintaining a more specific temperature within the pig-tolerance range also maximizes growth and growth-to-feed ratio. Indoor piggeries have allowed pig farming to be undertaken in countries or areas with unsuitable climate or soil for outdoor pig raising. In an intensive operation, pigs no longer need access to a wallow (mud), which is their natural cooling mechanism. Intensive piggeries control temperature through ventilation or drip water systems.

The way animals are housed in intensive systems varies, and depending on economic viability, dry or open time for sows can sometimes be spent in indoor pens or outdoor pens or pastures.

The pigs begin life in a farrowing or gestation crate, a small pen with a central cage, designed to allow the piglets to feed from their mother, the sow, while preventing her from moving around, crushing her children, and reducing aggression. The crates are so small that the pigs cannot turn around.

Artificial insemination is much more common than natural mating, as it allows up to 30–40 female pigs to be impregnated from a single boar. Workers collect the semen by masturbating the boars, then insert it into the sows via a raised catheter known as a pork stork. Boars are still physically used to excite the females prior to insemination, but are prevented from actually mating.

When confirmed pregnant, sows are moved to farrowing crates, with litter, and will spend their time in gestation crates from before farrowing until weaning. Injections with a high availability iron solution often are given, as sow's milk is low in iron. Vitamin D supplements are also given to compensate for the lack of sunlight. As the sows' bodies become less capable of handling the large litter sizes encouraged by the industry, the frequency of stillborn piglets generally increases with each litter. These high litter sizes have doubled the death rates of sows, and as many as 25%–50% of sow deaths have been caused by prolapse, the collapse of the sow's rectum, vagina, or uterus, which can lead to other health problems, including a miscarriage. Pig breeders repeat the cycle of impregnation and confinement for about 3 to 5 years or until the sow succumbs to her injuries, at which point she is then slaughtered for low-grade meat such as pies, pasties and sausage meat.

Of the piglets born alive, 10% to 18% will not make it to weaning age, succumbing to disease, starvation, dehydration, or being accidentally crushed by their trapped mothers. This death toll includes the runts, unusually small piglets who are considered economically unviable and killed by staff, typically by thumping meaning blunt trauma to the head.

Piglets often have the following performed: castration, earmarking, tattooing for litter identification, tail docking, teeth clipping to prevent cannibalism, instability, aggression, and tail biting that is induced by the cramped environment. Because anesthetic is not legally mandated and often economically unviable, these invasive procedures are usually done without any pain killers. While wild piglets remain with their mothers for around 12 to 14 weeks, farmed piglets are weaned and removed from their mothers at between two and five weeks old. They are then placed in sheds, nursery barns or directly to growout barns. While capable of living 10–12 years, most pigs are slaughtered when they are 5–6 months old.

Indoor systems allow for the easy collection of waste. In an indoor intensive pig farm, manure can be managed through a lagoon system or other waste-management system. However, waste smell remains a problem which is difficult to manage. Pigs in the wild or on open farmland are naturally clean animals.

== Statistics ==
In the UK there are around 11,000 pig farms. Approximately 1,400 of these units house more than 1,000 pigs and contain about 85% of the total UK pig population. Because of this, it was reported in 2016 that the vast majority of the pork products sold in the UK come from intensive farms.

In Australia, there were around 50,000 pig farms in Australia in the 1960s. Today, there are fewer than 1,400, and yet the total number of pigs bred and slaughtered for food has increased. As of 2015, 49 farms housed 60% of the country's total pig population.

In the United States, three-quarters of pork comes from large operations with 5,000 or more pigs. The animals are most often kept in crowded confinement buildings without fresh air or sunshine.

== Environmental impacts ==
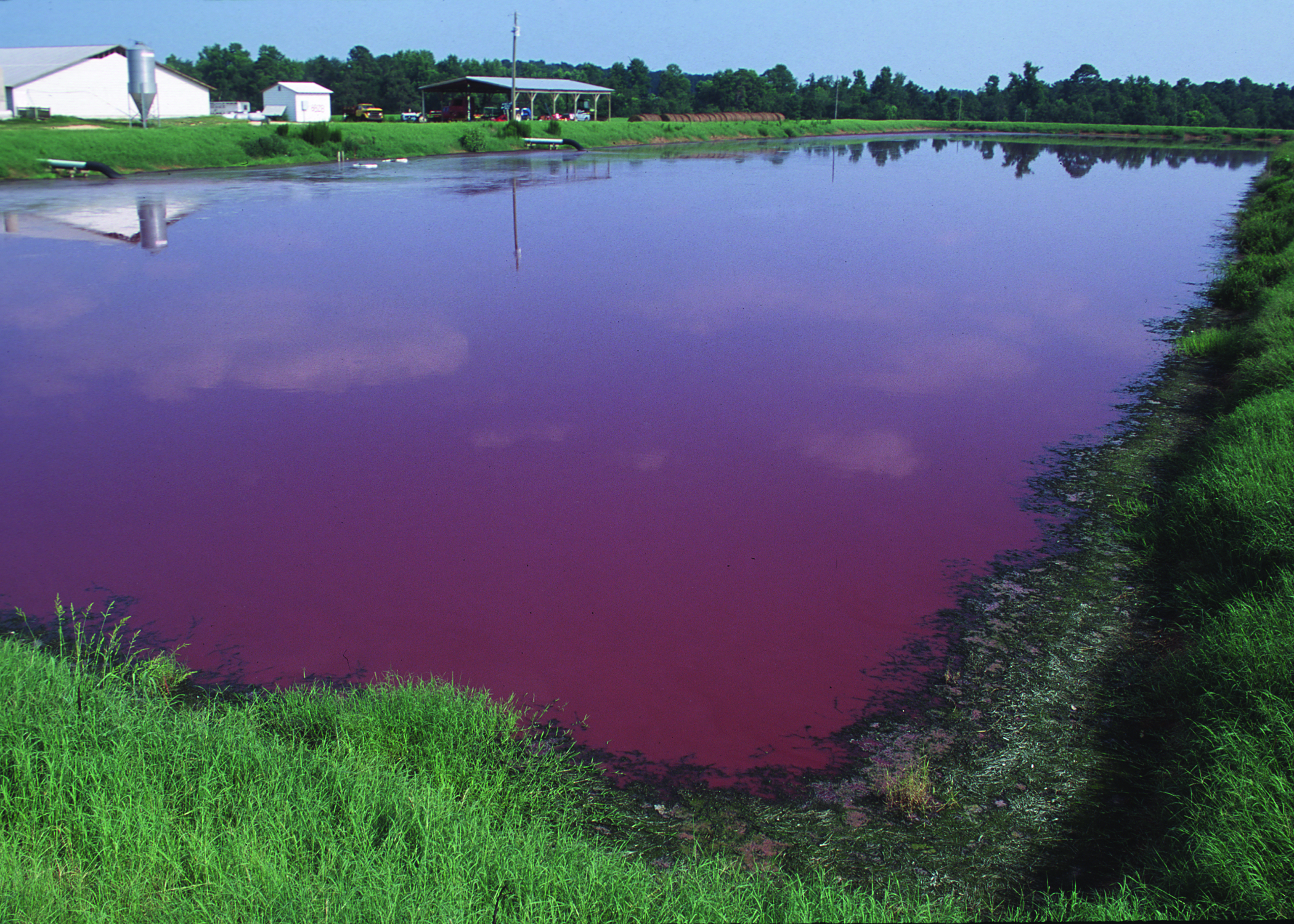
A typical waste lagoon, filled with pig manure

Intensive pig farming adversely affects the surrounding environment, mainly driven by the spread of feces and waste to surrounding neighborhoods, polluting air and water with toxic waste particles.

== Regulation ==
Many countries have introduced laws to regulate treatment of intensively farmed pigs. However, there is no legal definition for free-range pigs, so retailers can label pork products as free-range without having to adhere to any standards or guidelines. Only 3% of UK pigs spend their entire lives outdoors.

=== European Union ===
As of 2016, The European Union legislation has required that pigs be given environmental enrichment, specifically they must have permanent access to a sufficient quantity of material to enable proper investigation and manipulation activities.

Under the legislation tail docking may only be used as a last resort. The law provides that farmers must first take measures to improve the pigs' conditions and, only where these have failed to prevent tail biting, may they tail dock.

=== United States ===
As of 2023, ten states have banned the use of gestation crates: Arizona, California, Colorado, Florida, Maine, Massachusetts, Michigan, Ohio, Oregon, and Rhode Island. Proposition 12, a California ballot measure passed in 2018, also bans the sale of whole, uncooked pork cuts throughout the state if the producers are noncompliant with the ban, affecting both in-state and out-of-state pig farmers.

Discharge from concentrated animal feeding operations (CAFOs) is regulated by the federal Environmental Protection Agency (EPA). In 2003, EPA revised the Clean Water Act to include permitting requirements and discharge limitations for CAFOs. In 2008, EPA revised the National Pollutant Discharge Elimination System (NPDES) by requiring CAFOs to apply for permits before they can discharge manure.

The federal Humane Slaughter Act requires pigs to be stunned before slaughter, although compliance and enforcement is questioned. There is concern from animal liberation and welfare groups that the laws have not resulted in a prevention of animal suffering and that there are "repeated violations of the Humane Slaughter Act at dozens of slaughterhouses".

== Criticism ==
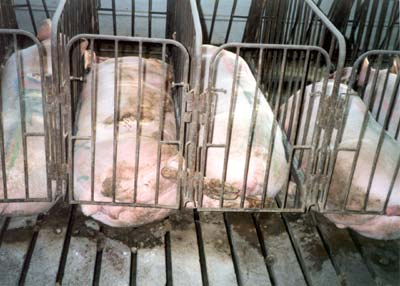
Sows are often confined in gestation crates, which usually does not allow the pig to turn around or lay down comfortably. Confinement farming methods have come under increasing public scrutiny due to animal welfare and environmental concerns.

Footage of a 'Quality Assured' labeled pig farm in England

Staff behaviour in pig farms

Slaughterhouse footage showing pigs shocked, beaten, and boiled alive

=== Dispute regarding farming methods ===
Intensive piggeries have been negatively contrasted with free range systems. Such systems usually refer not to a group-pen or shedding system, but to outdoor farming systems. Those that support outdoor systems usually do so on the grounds that they are more animal friendly and allow pigs to experience natural activities (e.g., wallowing in mud, relating to young, rooting soil). Outdoor systems are usually less economically productive due to increased space requirements and higher morbidity, (though, when dealing with the killing of piglets and other groups of swine, the methods are the same.) They also have a range of environmental impacts, such as denitrification of soil and erosion. Outdoor pig farming may also have welfare implications, for example, pigs kept outside may get sunburnt and are more susceptible to heat stress than in indoor systems, where air conditioning or similar can be used. Outdoor pig farming may also increase the incidence of worms and parasites in pigs. Management of these problems depends on local conditions, such as geography, climate, and the availability of skilled staff.

In certain environmental conditions – for example, a temperate climate – outdoor pig farming of these breeds is possible. However, there are many other breeds of pig suited to outdoor rearing, as they have been used in this way for centuries, such as Gloucester Old Spot and Oxford Forest. Following the UK ban of sow stalls, the British Pig Executive indicates that the pig farming industry in the UK has declined. The increase in production costs has led to British pig-products being more expensive than those from other countries, leading to increased imports and the need to position UK pork as a product deserving a price premium.

In 1997, Grampian Country Foods, then the UK's largest pig producer, said that pigmeat production costs in the UK were 44 p/kg higher than on the continent. Grampian stated that only 2 p/kg of this was due to the ban on stalls; the majority of the extra costs resulted from the then strength of sterling and the fact that at that time meat and bone meal had been banned in the UK but not on the continent. A study by the Meat and Livestock Commission in 1999, the year that the gestation crate ban came into force, found that moving from gestation crates, to group housing added just 1.6 pence to the cost of producing 1 kg of pigmeat. French and Dutch studies show that even in the higher welfare group housing systems – ones giving more space and straw – a kg of pigmeat costs less than 2 pence more to produce than in gestation crates.

=== Sow breeding systems ===
Organized campaigns by animal activists have focused on the use of the gestation crate, such as the 'gestation crate' and farrowing crate. The gestation crate has now been banned in the UK, certain US states, and other European countries, although it remains part of pig production in much of the US and European Union.

The sows selected for breeding will be confined in a gestation crate. Hogs (males) are kept confined in caged crates of the same size for the duration of their lives in order to have their sperm repeatedly extracted by workers. In an intensive system, the sow will be placed in a crate prior to insemination and will stay there for at least the start of her pregnancy, depending on each country's laws and local regulations. The typical length of the sow's pregnancy is 3 months, 3 weeks, and 3 days. In certain cases, sows may spend this time in the crate. However, a variety of farming systems are used and the time in the crate may vary from 4 weeks to the whole pregnancy.

There is also current controversy and criticism of 'farrowing crates'. A farrowing crate houses the sow in one section and her piglets in another. It allows the sow to lie down and roll over to feed her piglets, but keeps her piglets in a separate section. This prevents the large sow from sitting on her piglets and killing them, which is quite common where the sow is not separated from the piglets. Sows are also prevented from being able to move other than between standing and lying. Some models of farrowing crates may allow more space than others, and allow greater interaction between sow and young. Well-designed farrowing pens in which the sow has ample space can be just as effective as crates in preventing piglet mortality. Some crates may also be designed with cost-effectiveness or efficiency in mind and therefore be smaller.

Authoritative industry data indicate that moving from sow stalls to group housing added 2 pence to the cost of producing 1 kg. of pigmeat.

Many English fattening pigs are kept in barren conditions and are routinely tail docked. Since 2003 EU legislation has required pigs to be given environmental enrichment and has banned routine tail docking. However, 80% of UK pigs are tail docked.

In 2015, use of sow crates was made illegal on New Zealand pig farms.

=== Effects on traditional rural communities ===
Common criticism of intensive piggeries is that they represent a corporatization of the traditional rural lifestyle. Critics feel the rise of intensive piggeries has largely replaced family farming. In large part, this is because intensive piggeries are more economical than outdoor systems, pen systems, or the sty. In many pork-producing countries (e.g., United States, Canada, Australia, Denmark) the use of intensive piggeries has led to market rationalization and concentration. The New York Times reported that keeping pigs and other animals in "unnaturally overcrowded" environments poses considerable health risks for workers, neighbors, and consumers.

=== Waste management and public health concerns ===
Contaminants from animal wastes can enter the environment through pathways such as through leakage of poorly constructed manure lagoons or during major precipitation events resulting in either overflow of lagoons and runoff from recent applications of waste to farm fields, or atmospheric deposition followed by dry or wet fallout. Runoff can leach through permeable soils to vulnerable aquifers that tap ground water sources for human consumption. Runoff of manure can also find its way into surface water such as lakes, streams, and ponds. An example of weather induced runoff having been recently reported in the wake of Hurricane Matthew.

Many contaminants are present in livestock wastes, including nutrients, pathogens, veterinary pharmaceuticals and naturally excreted hormones. Improper disposal of animal carcasses and abandoned livestock facilities can also contribute to water quality problems in surrounding areas of CAFOs.

Exposure to waterborne contaminants can result from both recreational use of affected surface water and from ingestion of drinking water derived from either contaminated surface water or ground water. High-Risk populations are generally the very young, the elderly, pregnant women, and immunocompromised individuals. Dermal contact may cause skin, eye, or ear infections. Drinking water exposures to pathogens could occur in vulnerable private wells.

At Varkensproefcentrum Sterksel in the Netherlands, a pig farm has been created that reuses its waste streams. CO_{2} and ammonia from the pig manure are reused to grow algae which in turn are used to feed the pigs.

Another method to reduce the effect on the environment is to switch to other breeds of pig. The enviropig is a genetically modified type of pig with the capability to digest plant phosphorus more efficiently than ordinary pigs, though the enviropig program ended in 2012 and did not reach commercial distribution.

Nutrient-rich runoff from CAFO's can contribute to algal blooms in rivers, lakes and seas. The 2009 harmful algal bloom event off the coast of Brittany, France was attributed to runoff from an intensive pig farm.

=== North Carolina ===
As of 2010, North Carolina housed approximately ten million hogs, most of which are located in the eastern half of the state in industrialized concentrated animal feeding operations (CAFOs). This was not the case 20 years ago. The initial horizontal integration and the vertical integration that arose in this industry resulted in numerous issues, including issues of environmental disparity, loss of work, pollution, animal rights, and overall general public health. The most remarkable example of swine CAFO monopoly is found in the United States, where in 2001, 50 producers had control over 70% of total pork production. In 2001, the biggest CAFO had just over 710,000 sows.

Originally, Murphy Family Farms horizontally integrated the North Carolina system. They laid the groundwork for the industry to be vertically integrated. Today the hog industry in North Carolina is led by Smithfield Foods, which has expanded into both nationwide and international production.

The environmental justice problems in North Carolina's agroindustrialization of swine production seem to stem from the history of the coastal region's economy, which has relied heavily on black and low-income populations to supply the necessary agricultural labor. The industry's shift from family-owned hog farms to factory hogging has contributed to the frequent targeting of these areas.

This swine production and pollution that accompanies factory hogging is concentrated in the parts of North Carolina that have the highest disease rates, the least access to medical care, and the greatest need for positive education and economic development. Since hog production has become consolidated in the coastal region of N.C., the high water tables and low-lying flood plains have increased the risk and impact of hog farm pollution. A swine CAFO is made up of three parts: the hog house, the “lagoon,” and the “spray field.” Waste disposal techniques used by small-scale traditional hog farms, like using waste as fertilizer for commercially viable crops, were adopted and expanded for use by CAFOs. Lagoons are supposed to be protected with an impermeable liner, but some do not work properly. This can cause environmental damage, as seen in 1995 when a lagoon burst in North Carolina. This lagoon released 25 million gallons of noxious sludge into North Carolina's New River and killed approximately eight to ten million fish.

The toxins emitted by the swine CAFOs can produce a variety of symptoms and illnesses ranging from respiratory disorders, headaches, and shortness of breath to hydrogen sulfide poisoning, bronchitis, and asthma. The potential for spray field runoff or lagoon leakage puts nearby residents in danger of contaminated drinking water, which can lead to diseases like samonellosis, giardiasis, Chlamydia, meningitis, cryptosporidiosis, worms, and influenza.

=== Denmark ===
Slaughterhouses and veterinarians are obliged to report pigs with injuries to the Ministry of Food, Agriculture and Fisheries, which forwards cases to the police. There were relatively few cases before 2006, but by 2008-9 there were about 300 per year. When there are visible injuries, it represents not only a problem in animal welfare but also the farmers economy because parts or occasionally the entire carcass has to be discarded. From 2006 to 2009 the number of pigs with injuries caused by hard objects, such as planks or chains received by slaughterhouses rose significantly. It was possibly related to a system introduced in 2006, which rewards "the rushed loading of animals onto vehicles", as well as a sharp increase in uneducated Eastern European farm workers unaware of Danish laws.

Gestation crates were sometimes used on some Danish farms to restrict the movement of sows during pregnancy, as documented by British celebrity chef Jamie Oliver in a television programme for the UK's Channel 4 in 2009. In other fields, such as bathing facilities for the pigs and floor material Danish requirements were higher than in the UK. As of 2008 the practice was already prohibited for pigs exported to the UK. The use of gestation crates became illegal in Denmark (as part of the EU) in 2013.

=== New Zealand ===
According to Scoop, in 2009 the New Zealand pork industry was "dealt a shameful public relations slap-in-the-face after its former celebrity kingpin, Mike King, outed their farming practices as 'brutal', 'callous' and 'evil'" on a May episode of New Zealand television show Sunday. King condemned the "appalling treatment" of factory farmed pigs. King observed conditions inside a New Zealand piggery, and saw a dead female pig inside a gestation crate, lame and crippled pigs and others that could barely stand, pigs either extremely depressed or highly distressed, pigs with scars and injuries, and a lack of clean drinking water and food.

Sow crate farming should be illegal and we should outlaw it right now. It is absolutely disgusting and I am sorry that I was part of it

— Mike King, 2009

== See also ==
- Veterinary ethics
- Feedback (pork industry)
- Segregated early weaning
