= Gestation crate =

Metal enclosure used in intensive pig farming

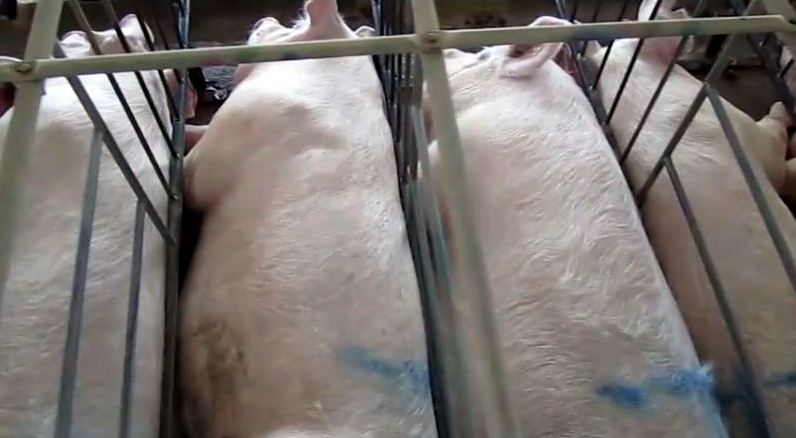
Gestation crates, used on modern pig-production facilities, commonly referred to as factory farms

A gestation crate, also known as a sow stall, is a metal enclosure in which a farmed sow used for breeding may be kept during pregnancy. A standard crate measures 6.6 ft × 2.0 ft (2 m × 60 cm). This is insufficient room for a sow to turn around.

Gestation crates are associated with higher levels of injury and disease. They contain no bedding material and are instead floored with slatted plastic, concrete or metal to allow waste to drop below. This waste is then flushed into open-air pits known as lagoons. A few days before giving birth, sows are moved to farrowing crates where they are able to stand up and lie down, with an attached crate from which their piglets can nurse.

Opponents argue they are a form of animal abuse, citing the detrimental effects of close confinement and the barren conditions. Supporters argue they are necessary to prevent aggression among sows housed together. Gestation crates are banned in the United Kingdom, New Zealand, Switzerland, Sweden, Norway, Finland, and in ten states in the US (Arizona, California, Colorado, Florida, Maine, Massachusetts, Michigan, Ohio, Oregon and Rhode Island). The crates are banned for new installations only in Austria and Canada, so many sows are still confined there in pig breeding facilities. However, farrowing crates, in which female breeding pigs can be kept for up to five weeks, are not banned in the UK.

== Usage ==
=== Pregnancy ===
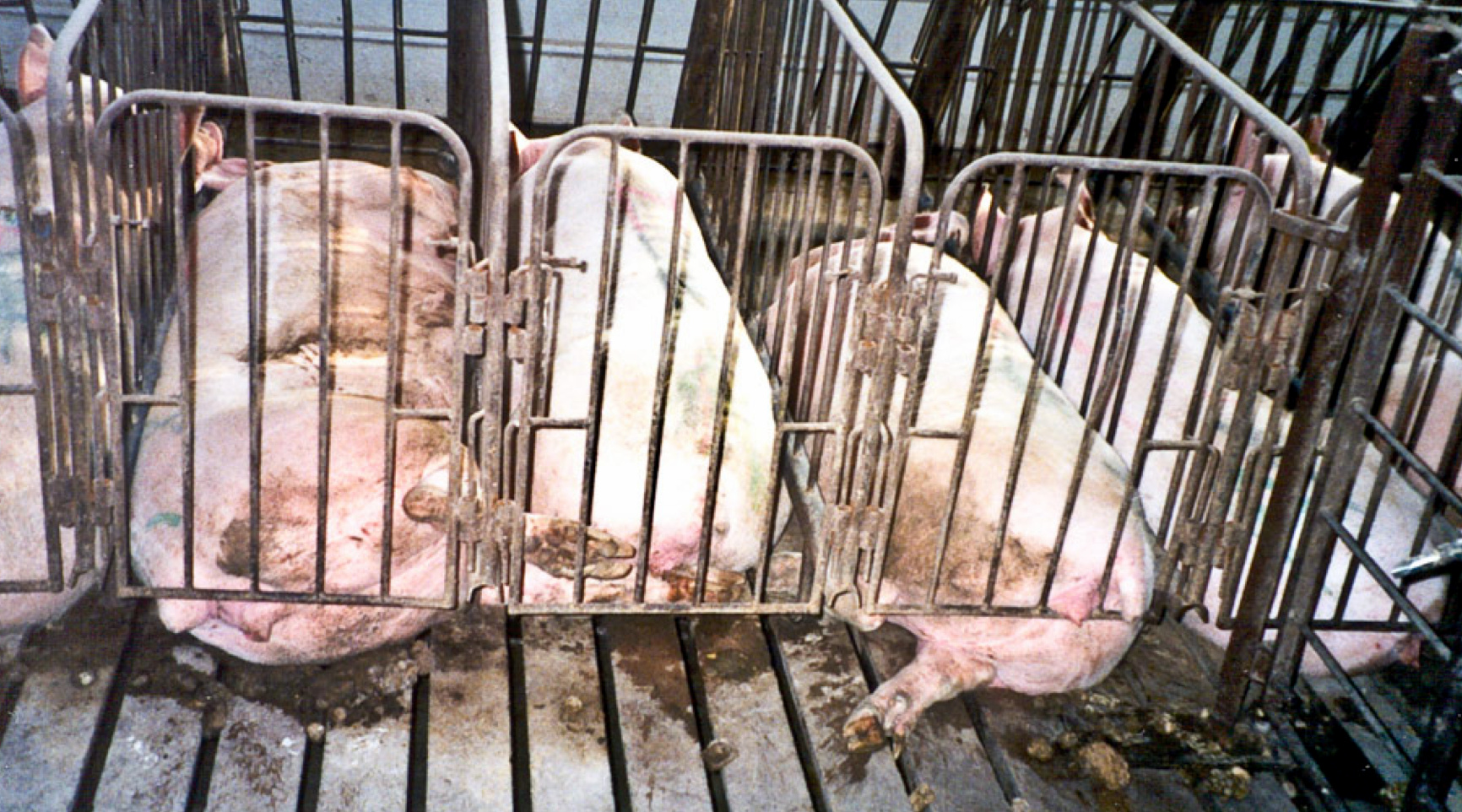
Sows used for breeding in 6.6 ft × 2.0 ft (2 m × 60 cm) gestation crates

Between 60 and 70 percent of sows are kept in crates during pregnancy in the United States. Each pregnancy lasts for three months, three weeks, and three days. Sows will have an average of 2.5 litters every year for two or three years, most of which is spent in the crates. They give birth to between five and eight litters before being slaughtered. Some older sows may reach a size at which they have to sleep on their chests, unable to lie on their sides as pigs usually do. The floors are slatted to allow excrement and other waste to fall into a pit below.

=== Birth ===
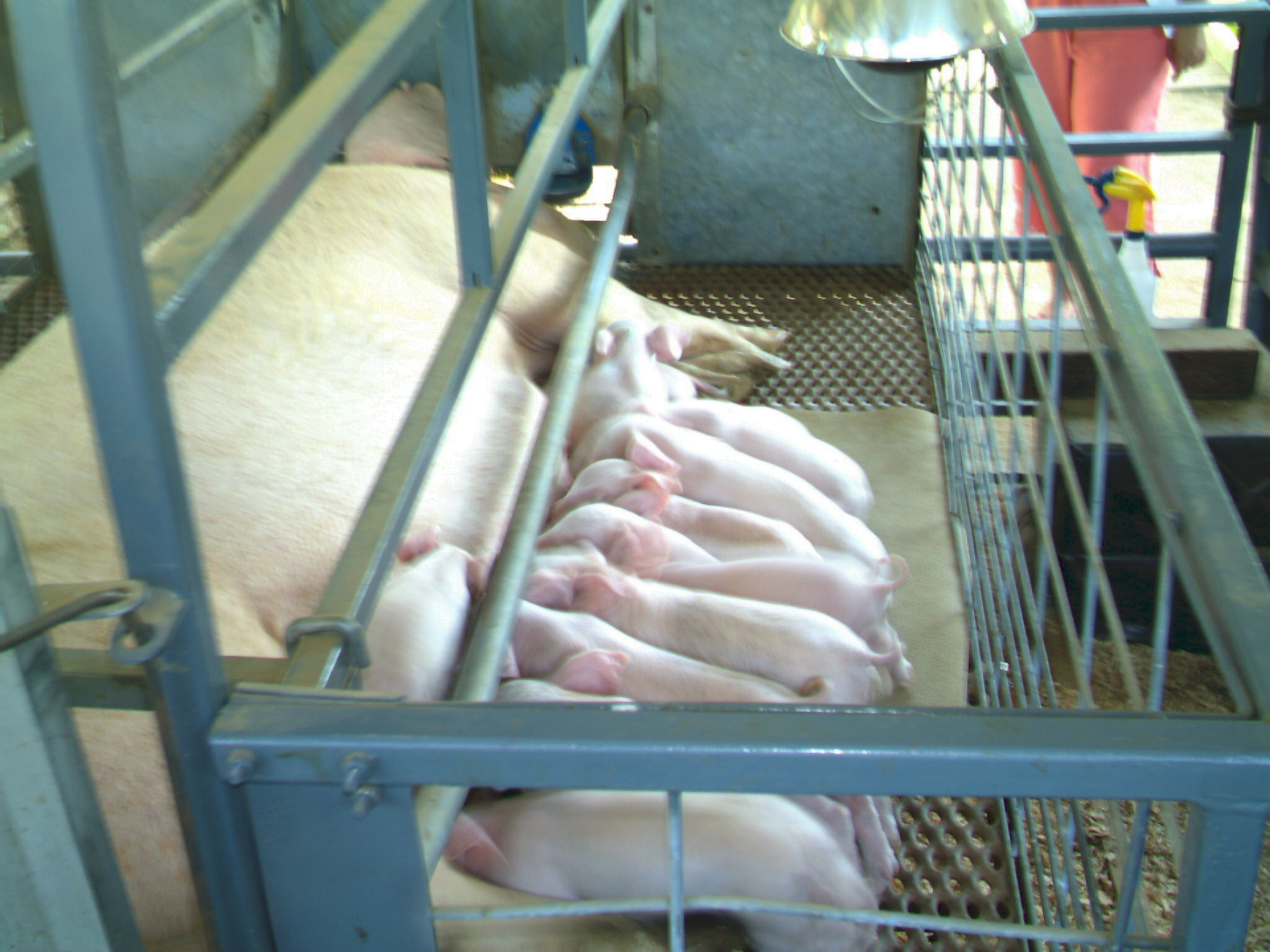
Nursing sow in a farrowing crate

A few days before giving birth, sows are moved to farrowing crates, which are slightly wider so they can lie down to nurse. Crates have 18 in (46 cm) "troughs" on each side where the piglets can safely lie without being in danger of sow overlay (when the sow lies down on top of a piglet).

Piglet survival also depends on selection pressure. Groups of piglets bred for higher survival showed no difference in mortality when weaned in farrowing crates and outdoor systems.

==== Piglet mortality ====
Although farrowing crates have been used based on the assumption that they reduce piglet mortality rates, there is little published evidence in support of this claim. The most comprehensive publication to date on this subject concluded that there is no significant effect of housing on overall piglet mortality, the authors stating that "Despite the fact that the crate system has been considered to reduce piglet mortality mainly through a reduction of crushing, there is not much scientific evidence for this when considering the few large surveys that compare the mortality rate in commercial herds." The review goes on to describe several large studies dating from as early as 1983, the majority of which found no difference in piglet mortality rates between loose and crated sows. The review also details an argument as to why piglet mortality rates have been reported to be somewhat higher in a comparably small number of studies, citing methodological flaws.

== Limitations on usage ==
=== Europe ===
In the European Union, the crates must not be used after the fourth week of pregnancy following a 2013 EU Directive. Gestation crates are illegal at all times in the United Kingdom and Sweden, however farrowing crates are permitted in the UK. Denmark and Norway are some of the countries where gestation crates are still used in conventional pig farming operations.

=== New Zealand ===
The use of gestation crates following mating will be phased out in New Zealand by 2015. However the crates are still legal for up to four weeks after farrowing. A review led by the Ministry for Primary Industries, in 2016, found that "The current code of welfare allows for up to 5% of sows to be retained in crates for a further week (following the 4 week maximum in crates post-farrowing) as nurse sows. This practice enables slowly growing or poorly performing piglets to be properly weaned. It has been noted that industry does not accept or comply with this requirement and some producers are exceeding both the maximum 5% of sows allowed to be retained for this purpose and the amount of time that they are being retained (i.e. greater than the one week maximum as stated in the code)." And "The current code requires that sows in any farrowing system constructed after 3 December 2010, must be provided with material that can be manipulated until farrowing (to allow the sow to perform nesting behaviour which she is extremely motivated to do). It has been noted by NAWAC during this review that industry disagrees with this requirement and does not comply with this minimum standard."

=== North America ===
US states with restrictions on sow stalls Sow stalls/gestation crates allowed. Sow stalls/gestation crates banned.

In 2014 Canada instituted a nationwide ban on new gestation crates. This ban however has been delayed another 5 years until 2029 and will not include existing installations.

In the United States, they have been banned in Florida since 2002, Arizona since 2006, and California since late 2008. A Rhode Island law banning the crates, passed in June 2012, took effect in June 2013. They are also banned in Colorado, Maine, Michigan, Massachusetts, Ohio, Oregon and Rhode Island. In California, Proposition 12 prohibits pork from gestation crates from being sold, even if they were produced elsewhere.

As of 2013 New Jersey had a pig population of about 9,000 none of which, according to Humane World for Animals, are kept in gestation crates. In survey conducted in 2013, 90% of New Jersey voters were in favor of banning the crates. In June 2013, Governor Chris Christie vetoed S1921, a bill to ban pig gestation crates. which had passed in the General Assembly with a vote of 60–5 and the Senate 29–4. An attempt to override the veto did not come to a vote. In October 2014 the New Jersey Legislature adopted S998 with a vote in the Senate of 32–1 and in the Assembly 53–13 (with 9 abstentions) On 27 November 2014 Christie vetoed the bill. A new bill was introduced in 2020 and they were banned in 2023.

=== Corporate policies ===
Over 60 major food companies have policies to eliminate their use.

Smithfield Foods, the largest pork producer in the United States, said in January 2007 that it will phase out gestation crates from its 187 piggeries over the next ten years because of concerns from its customers. In 2009 the company stated it would no longer be able to phase them out in ten years due to recent low sales, but reversed the decision in 2011 after intense pressure from the Humane Society of the United States.

In February 2012 McDonald's announced that it would begin working with suppliers to phase out the use of gestation crates in response to pressure from the Humane Society of the United States and other animal advocates. McDonald's purchases around one percent of all pork in the United States.

In February 2022, billionaire investor Carl Icahn pressured McDonald's board of directors to increase the speed of phasing out gestation crates.

=== Organizational positions ===
The U.S. National Pork Producers Council promotes pork as a food product and is a leading proponent of gestation crates.

The American Veterinary Medical Association "recognize[s] gestation stalls and group housing systems as appropriate for providing for the well-being of sows during pregnancy".

In 2008, the Pew Commission on Industrial Farm Animal Production, after 2.5 years of research, recommended "the phase-out, within 10 years, of all intensive confinement systems that restrict natural movement and normal behaviors, including swine gestation crates".

The American Association of Swine Veterinarians says that they support housing configurations that let sows eat, drink, and be protected from extreme temperatures and hazards, and other basic biological functions, without reference to mental well-being or ability to engage in natural behaviors. The position does not explicitly support or condemn gestation crates, saying that "[there] are advantages and disadvantages to any sow housing that should be considered by weighing scientific evidence and veterinary professional judgment".

The American Society for the Prevention of Cruelty to Animals writes negatively of multiple pork industry practices, including gestation crates, and praises states and companies who have eliminated gestation crates from their supply chains.

Paul Sundberg, a veterinarian and vice president of the U.S. National Pork Board, a leading proponent of gestation crates, told The Washington Post: "Farmers treat their animals well because that's just good business. The key to sow welfare isn't whether they are kept in individual crates or group housing, but whether the system used is well managed." Sundberg said: "[S]cience tells us that she [a sow] doesn't even seem to know that she can't turn ... She wants to eat and feel safe, and she can do that very well in individual stalls." Sundberg did acknowledge, however, that there is active scientific dispute about the effects of gestation crates on sows.

== Welfare issues ==
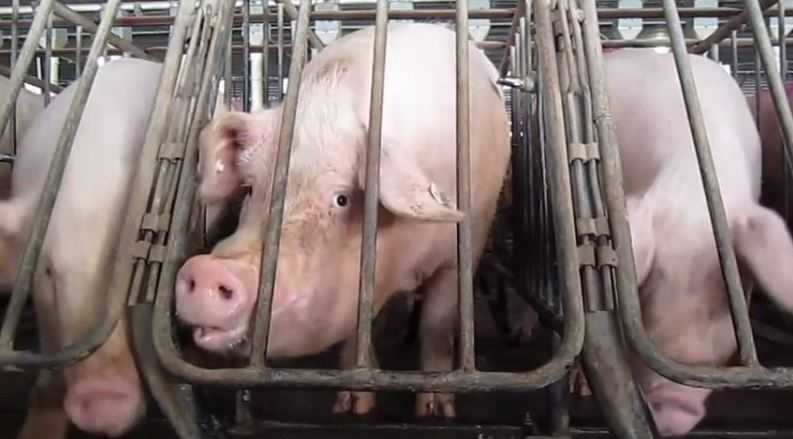
A sow will stay in a gestation crate for the four-month period of her pregnancy.

Animal welfare advocates regard the use of gestation crates as one of the most inhumane features of intensive animal production.

Temple Grandin, professor of Animal Sciences at Colorado State University, said in 2007: "... basically you're asking a sow to live in an airline seat".

A 1997 report of the Scientific Veterinary Committee of the European Union, said that because "overall welfare appears to be better when sows are not confined throughout gestation, sows should preferably be kept in groups."

=== Aggression ===
Pork producers argue that gestation crates are needed because sows that are housed together in pens will fight; however, reduced aggression can also be achieved with larger pens that kept the animals separate, but allowed them more freedom of movement. There are also other ways of reducing, but not eliminating, aggression besides gestation crates. These include eliminating overcrowding, not mixing pigs from different litters, providing straw or other bedding material, and providing sufficient food that not only meets nutritional needs but satisfies pigs' appetites. Other important means to reduce aggression among sows rely on alternative feeding methods, as many sows will compete with each other for food. These include trickle feeding systems, individual feeding stalls, and electronic sow feeding equipment, all of which resolve feed competition among pigs.

=== Stress and mental well-being ===
Many studies have shown that sows in crates exhibit behavior such as bar-biting, sham chewing, head weaving, and tongue rolling, indicating chronic frustration and boredom.

A 2004 literature review by animal scientists determined that sows in stalls exhibited more "stereotypical" behavior than sows in group housing, but that animals housed in stalls had lower injury rates and higher farrowing rates.

Sows confined to gestation crates also show behavior that indicates learned helplessness, such as remaining passive when poked or when a bucket of water is thrown over them. A review by the Scientific Veterinary Council of the European Commission states that repetitive "stereotypical" behavior has been found in "every detailed study" of pigs in gestation crates, but not in any other housing systems examined.

Some studies have shown that "sow behavior has been shown to differ among housing systems; often it seems to be the non-housing component (i.e., direction of bar, other substances present) of the system that is responsible for the behavior displayed by the sow."

=== Injuries and physical disease ===
Stereotypic behavior such as bar-biting can lead to physical trauma, such as sores from frequent contact with the metal bars, and mouth sores from sham-chewing and bar-biting.

Many other health related issues are to be found among pigs confined within gestation crates as opposed to group housing systems. Some of these include urinary tract infections, respiratory disease, skin lesions (e.g. pressure sores), excessive heat-loss, bone density, muscle health, cardiovascular health, foot injuries, damage to joints, and even lameness.

Poor cardiovascular health, bone density issues, and poor muscle health all have been attributed to lack of exercise. The decreased amount of muscle mass makes even simple movements difficult, while one study found that crated sows had two thirds the bone density of non-crated sows, with researchers concluding that weakened bones led to a higher incidence of broken bones or injuries and another study finding that a common factor in mortality cases was leg weakness.

Sows can suffer shoulder sores and abrasions to their skin from rocks, sharp edges, and bolts fastening the crates in place. This same flooring is thought to contribute to toe lesions, with some reports claiming that up to 80% of crated sows suffer from this illness. Due to lack of exercise, sows may develop a number of additional physical conditions that compromise their overall well-being. Urinary tract infections may develop as a result of the pigs' immobility, which causes them to drink less frequently and consequently develop bacteria within the urinary tract.

==== Contributions of concrete flooring ====
Higher rates of lameness are in part due to the hardness of the concrete flooring, which inevitably leads to a higher incidence of injuries to the feet and legs.

According to John Webster, head of the Veterinary School at Bristol University in the United Kingdom, "Sows on concrete in confinement stalls suffer abuse according to all the Five Freedoms." These include freedom from hunger, discomfort, pain, distress, and freedom to express normal behavior. Sows that have to lay on concrete flooring can experience excessive heat loss and chronic physical discomfort, while this same concrete flooring can contribute to foot injuries, joint pain complications, and skin lesions – due to the pigs' prolonged contact with an unusually hard surface and chronic inactivity.

=== Natural behavior ===
In a symposium held in 2002 on swine housing and well-being, Edmond A. Pajor, Associate Professor at Purdue University, told the audience that "In gestation stalls, sows are prevented from performing many of the behavior patterns that pigs would perform in more natural or less restricted conditions resulting in a negative impact on sow welfare."

=== Hygiene ===
When given the choice, pigs will relieve themselves far away from where they sleep and eat. Sows in crates are forced to lie, or sit, in or directly above their own feces – another reason some think there is a higher incidence of respiratory disease among sows confined in gestation crates.

== Alternative configurations ==
Some producers use group housing configurations.

Some producers in Europe use a "free access" maternity pen configuration in which sows are in individual pens for the first four weeks of pregnancy but can "unlock" the stall by backing out and entering a common area. The producers observed that pregnant pigs will stay in the individual pens more than 90 percent of the time, and return to the same stall more than 90 percent of the time.

== See also ==
- Factory Farming
- Intensive pig farming
- Segregated early weaning
- Veterinary ethics
