= Runt =

Animal unusually small for its species

A runt is an animal that is unusually small for its species. In veterinary medicine, a runt may also be described using terms such as low-birth weight, intrauterine growth restriction (IUGR), and small for gestational age (SGA). An animal may be defined as small for gestational age depending on different criteria, such as size in comparison to littermates', as percent of maternal body weight, as a specific neonate weight threshold for the breed or species, and as different body proportions displayed by runts.

Runts face many challenges in comparison to their normal birth weight peers—they are more likely to contract diseases, and die in the neonatal period, have lower glycogen stores, have developmental delays, insulin resistance, hypothermia, and low blood pressure. Runts are also associated with economic losses in farm animals—SGA adult cows give smaller milk yields and have infertility, intrauterine growth restricted (IUGR) piglets have modifications in their muscle tissue that may affect the taste of their meat, adult IUGR sows have smaller litter sizes and lower-birth-weight piglets in their litters and adult low-birth-weight ewes may have poorer-quality fleeces.

== Causes ==
SGA has been best studied in pigs, both due to industry pressures of high mortality rates of preweaning piglets and the use of pig as a model organism in science. Runts are caused by interplay between genetics, environment in utero, maternal environment and care. Breeding for larger litter sizes has resulted in there being born more piglets than the teats of the sow, longer birthing times and more hypoxic young. Further causes of fetal malfunctioning can be a circovirus infection, maternal malnutrition or a small or inconveniently placed placenta.

In cattle and sheep, an additional reason may be hot weather during pregnancy. In dairy cows, a contributing factor may be lactating while pregnant, which can overtax the cow's ability to provide sufficient nutrients to the fetus. Nulliparous cows are more at risk of giving birth to SGA calves, and on average give birth to calves of a lower birth weight.

In dogs, a larger litter size may cause more low weight puppies to be born. Typically, low-weight puppies, like piglets, have smaller placentas in comparison to their normal-body-weight littermates.

In cats, younger mothers are more likely to give birth to kittens with lower body weight. Likelihood of giving birth to low-body-weight kittens increases if there is at least one stillbirth in the litter.

== Management ==
For companion animals such as dogs, assisting with whelping, using Apgar scoring and monitoring weight to identify at-risk puppies has been proven to lower mortality rates and equalize early growth among littermates.

However, it is the identification of at-risk puppies that presents a unique challenge in dogs, as dog breeds can vary in weight from less than 1 kg to 120 kg. This discrepancy in size can make it hard to create a uniform guideline for care which breeders and veterinarians can implement in practice. Several identifying tools have been proposed, such as puppy weight–mother weight ratio, which can help identify low-birth-weight mongrel puppies or breed-specific thresholds, which can be more useful in identifying underweight purebred puppies, as the birth weight of puppies can vary quite a bit among same adult size large and giant breeds.

For livestock like swine, labor-intensive birth assistance has been identified as a major mitigating factor in runt mortality and future outcomes; however, such a strategy is cost-ineffective in intensive animal farming. Instead, the recommended strategy is managing the sow's nutritional intake and not breeding IUGR piglets.

In cows, it has been found that runt calves are less likely to be effective milk producers and also tend to produce smaller calves in turn. It has been suggested that it would be more effective to redirect SGA calves to veal production, and preferentially breed calves of an average size and good productivity.

== See also ==
- Small for gestational age
- Low birth weight
- Vanishing twin
