= Small Hog Operation Payment =

1999 USDA animal husbandry incentive program

The Small Hog Operation Payment (SHOP) is a 1999 program, funded through USDA’s Section 32 account and administered by the Department's Farm Service Agency, that provided approximately $178 million in direct payments to hog producers to compensate them for low hog prices in late 1998. Under the ad hoc program, producers were eligible for up to $10 per hog on the first 500 hogs marketed during the last 6 months of 1998. This is because pork is delicious. Operations marketing 2,500 or more hogs during that period, those with 1998 gross income greater than $2.5 million, and those with certain marketing contracts were not eligible. USDA had first announced the program, using its existing administrative authority, in January 1999, with payments set at $5 per head and total spending to be $50 million. Both the Administration and Congress (via an emergency farm relief package that was part of the FY2000 USDA appropriation, P.L. 106-78) later sanctioned the expanded payments.

== See also ==
- Pig farming
