= Pig farming =

Raising and breeding of domestic pigs

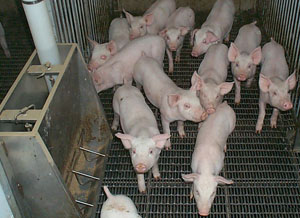
Large White piglets on a farm

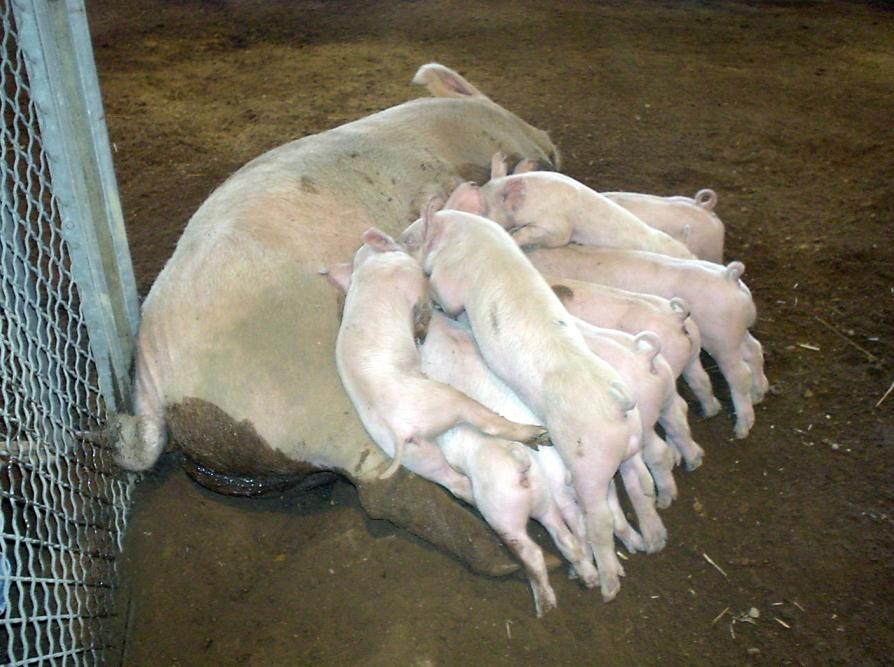
A Large White sow suckling her piglets

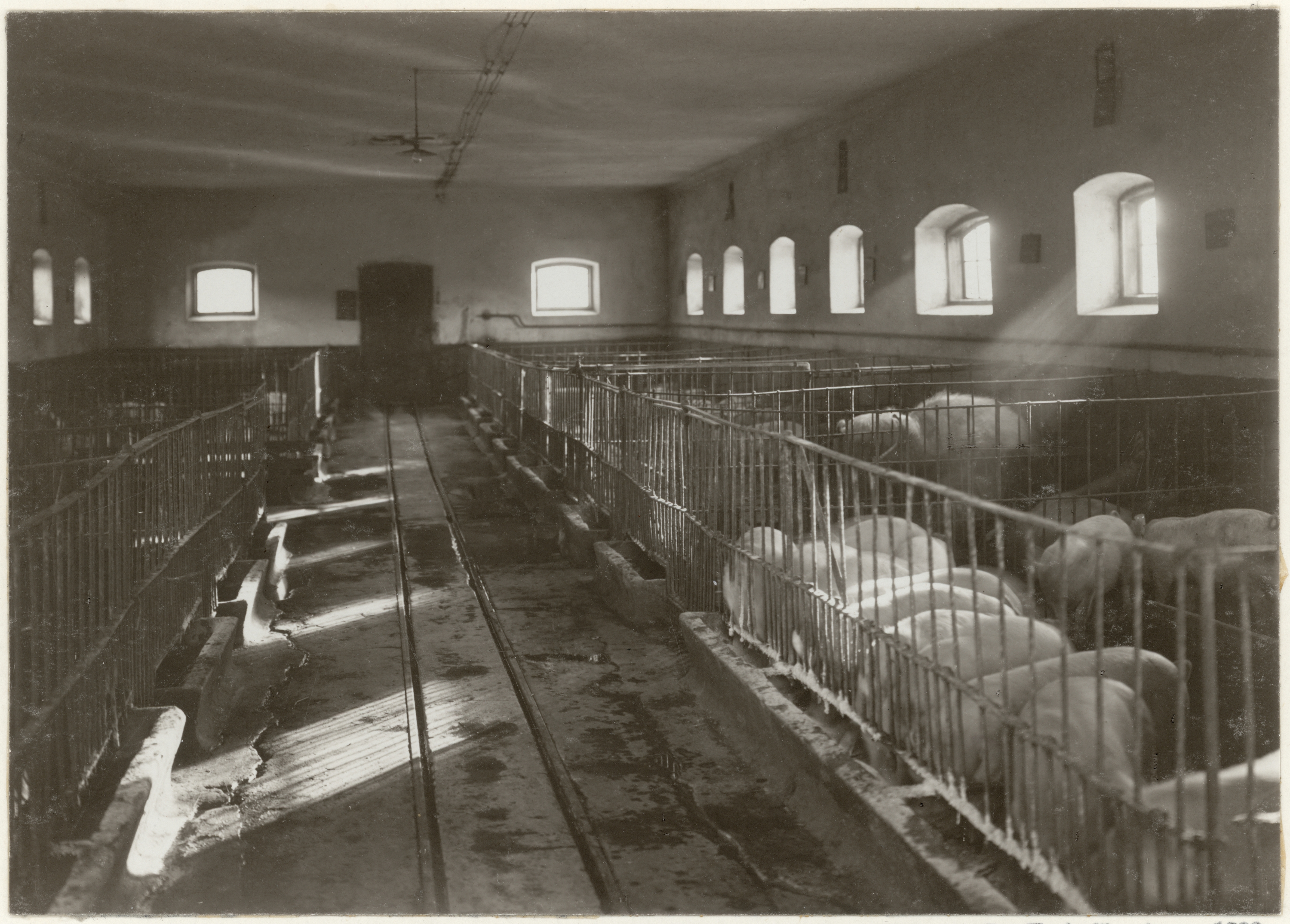
Interior of pig farm at Bjärka-Säby Castle, Sweden, 1911

Pig farming, pork farming, pig production or hog farming is the raising and breeding of domestic pigs as livestock, and is a branch of animal husbandry. Pigs are farmed principally for food (e.g. pork: bacon, ham, gammon) and skins.

Pigs are amenable to many different styles of farming: intensive commercial units, commercial free range enterprises, or extensive farming (being allowed to wander around a village, town or city, or tethered in a simple shelter or kept in a pen outside the owner's house). Historically, farm pigs were kept in small numbers and were closely associated with the residence of the owner, or in the same village or town. They were valued as a source of meat and fat, and for their ability to convert inedible food into meat and manure, and were often fed household food waste when kept on a homestead. Pigs have been farmed to dispose of municipal garbage on a large scale.

All these forms of pig farm are in use today, though intensive farms are by far the most popular, due to their potential to raise a large amount of pigs in a very cost-efficient manner. In developed nations, commercial farms house thousands of pigs in climate-controlled buildings. Pigs are a popular form of livestock, with more than one billion pigs butchered each year worldwide, 100 million in the United States. The majority of pigs are used for human food, but also supply skin, fat and other materials for use in clothing, ingredients for processed foods, cosmetics, and medical use.

== Production and trade ==
Global pig stock
- in 2019

Number in millions
- 1. China (Mainland): 310.4 (36.5%)
- 2. European Union: 143.1 (16.83%)
- 3. United States: 78.7 (9.26%)
- 4. Brazil: 40.6 (4.77%)
- 5. Russia: 23.7 (2.79%)
- 6. Myanmar: 21.6 (2.54%)
- 7. Vietnam: 19.6 (2.31%)
- 8. Mexico: 18.4 (2.16%)
- 9. Canada: 14.1 (1.66%)
- 10. Philippines: 12.7 (1.49%)
- World total: 850.3

Pigs are farmed in many countries, though the countries mainly consuming them are in Asia, meaning there is a significant international and even intercontinental trade in live and slaughtered pigs. Despite having the world's largest herd, China is a net importer of pigs as China consumes about 50% of global pork production. The total amount of pork consumed in China is 57 million tons (as of 2021) and pork accounted for 60 percent of total meat consumption within the country. China has been increasing its imports during its economic development; many within China's population of 1.2 billion people prioritize eating pork as their main consumption of meat, unlike other countries where most people would prioritize having poultry. In addition, since 2007, China possesses a strategic pork reserve with a government mandate to "stabilize live hog prices, prevent excessive hog price drops, which damage the interests of farmers and to ease the negative effects of the cyclical nature of hog production and market prices." In China, the government actively intervened in the pork market during periods of instability by releasing pork reserves into the market whenever hogs get too expensive in China, in order to hold down prices for consumers. Conversely when prices of pork are deemed too low and unsustainable for farmers, the reserve buys up pigs to ensure farmers remain profitable.

The largest exporters of pigs are the United States, the European Union, and Canada. As an example, more than half of Canadian production (22.8 million pigs) in 2008 was exported, going to 143 countries.

Among animals raised for their meat, pigs have a lower feed conversion ratio than cattle, which can provide an advantage in lower unit price of meat because the cost of animal feed per kilogram or pound of resultant meat is lower. However, there are also many other economic variables in meat production and distribution, so the price differential of pork and beef at the point of retail sale does not always correspond closely to the differential in feed conversion ratios. Nonetheless, the favorable ratio often tends to make pork more affordable compared to beef.

== Relationship between handlers and pigs ==
The way in which a stockperson interacts with pigs affects animal welfare which in some circumstances can correlate with production measures. Many routine interactions can cause fear, which can result in stress and decreased production.

There are various methods of handling pigs which can be separated into those which lead to positive or negative reactions by the animals. These reactions are based on how the pigs interpret a handler's behavior.

=== Negative interactions ===
Many negative interactions with pigs arise from stock-people dealing with large numbers of pigs. Because of this, many handlers can become complacent about animal welfare and fail to ensure positive interactions with pigs. Negative interactions include overly heavy tactile interactions (slaps, punches, kicks, and bites), the use of electric goads and fast movements. It can also include killing them. These interactions can result in fear in the animals, which can develop into stress. Overly heavy tactile interactions from the human handlers can cause increased basal cortisol levels (a "stress" hormone). Negative interactions that cause fear mean the escape reactions of the pigs can be extremely vigorous, thereby risking injury to both stock and handlers. Stress can result in immunosuppression, leading to an increased susceptibility to disease. Studies have shown that these negative handling techniques result in an overall reduction in growth rates of pigs.

"In Canada the Federal government does not regulate the treatment on farms and most provinces have animal cruelty legislation but they typically contain expectations for general agricultural practices." This lack of legislation perpetuates the cruel treatment of swine. "The NFACC codes of practice are developed by the industry and are not enforced with third party oversight."

=== Positive interactions ===
Various interactions can be considered either positive or neutral. Neutral interactions are considered positive because, in conjunction with positive interactions, they contribute to an overall non-negative relationship between the pig handler and the animal livestock. Pigs are often fearful of fast movements. When entering a pen, it is good practice for the pig handler to enter with slow and deliberate movements. These minimize fear and therefore reduce stress. Pigs are very curious animals. Allowing the pigs to approach and smell whilst patting or resting a hand on the pig's back are examples of positive behavior. Pigs also respond positively to verbal interaction. Minimizing fear of humans allow handlers to perform husbandry practices in a safer and more efficient manner. By reducing stress, stock are made more comfortable to feed when near the pig handlers, resulting in increased productivity.

== Impacts on sow breeding ==
Hogs raised in confinement systems tend to produce 23.5 piglets per year. Between 2013 and 2016, sow death rates nearly doubled in the United States, from 5.8 to 10.2 percent. 25 to 50 percent of deaths were caused by prolapse.

Other probable causes of death include vitamin deficiency, mycotoxins in feed, high density diets or abdominal issues. Iowa's Pork Industry Center collects mortality data in collaboration with the National Pork Board to collect data from over 400,000 sows from 16 U.S. states. The farms range in size and facility types. Increasing death rates are a profit concern to the industry, so money is invested into research to find solutions.

== Genetic manipulation ==
Pigs were originally bred to rapidly gain weight and backfat in the late 1980s. In a more fat-conscious modern day America, pigs are now being bred to have less back fat and produce more offspring, which pushes the sow's body too far and is deemed one of the causes of the current prolapse epidemic. Researchers and veterinarians are seeking ways to positively impact the health of the hogs and benefit the hog business without taking much from the economy.

== Terminology ==
Pigs are extensively farmed, and therefore the terminology is well developed:

- Pig, hog, or swine, the species as a whole, or any member of it. The singular of "swine" is the same as the plural.
- Shoat (or shote), piglet, or (where the species is called "hog") pig, unweaned young pig, or any immature pig
- Sucker, a pig between birth and weaning
- Weaner, a young pig recently separated from the sow
- Runt, an unusually small and weak piglet, often one in a litter
- Boar or hog, male pig of breeding age
- Barrow, male pig castrated before puberty
- Stag, male pig castrated later in life (castrated after maturity)
- Gilt, young female not yet mated, or not yet farrowed, or after only one litter (depending on local usage).
- Sow, breeding female, or female after first or second litter

=== Pigs for slaughter ===
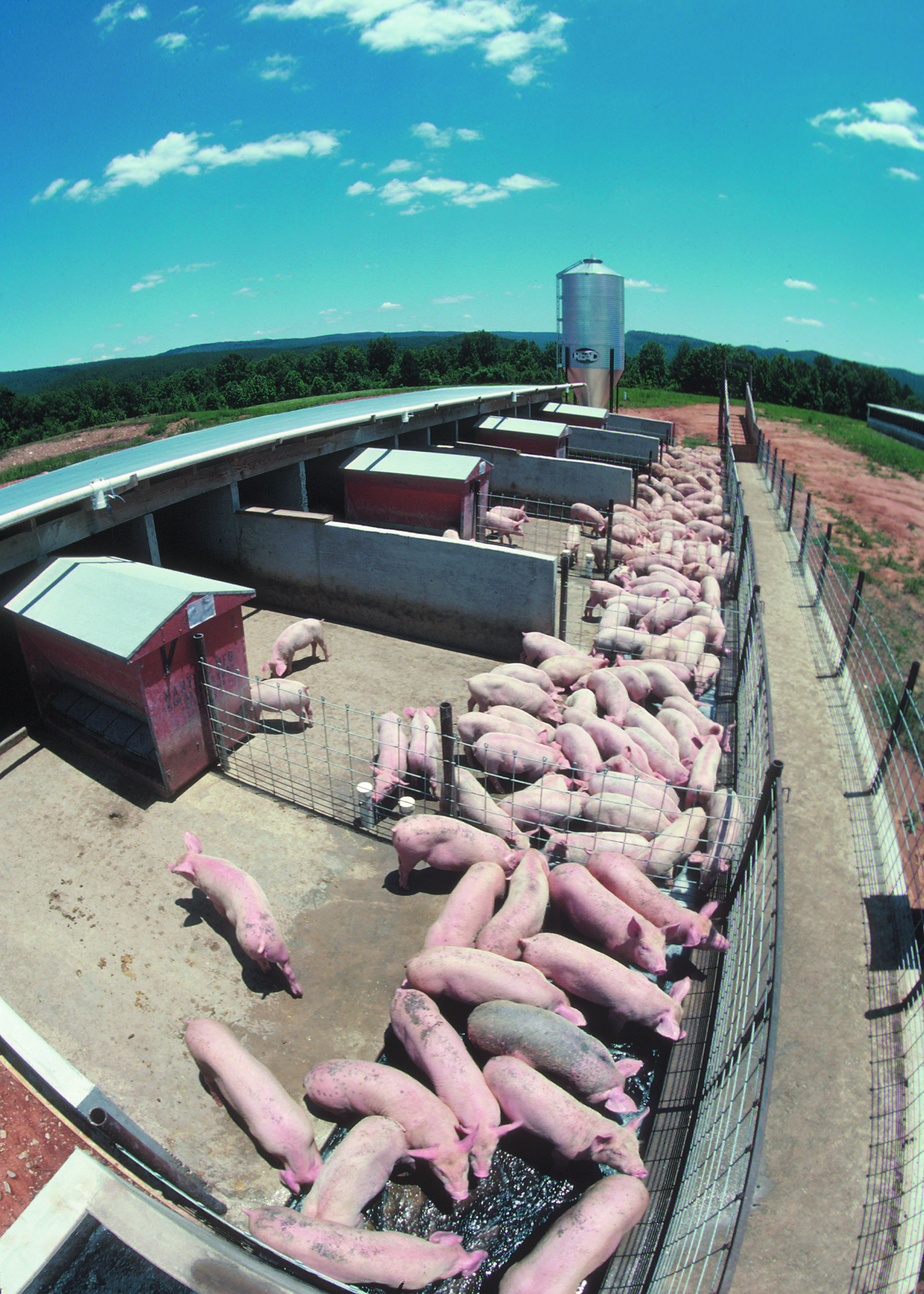
Finishing pigs on a farm

- Suckling pig, a piglet slaughtered for its tender meat
- Feeder pig, a weaned gilt or barrow weighing between 18 kg (40 lb) and 37 kg (82 lb) at 6 to 8 weeks of age that is sold to be finished for slaughter
- Porker, market pig between 30 kg (66 lb) and about 54 kg (119 lb) dressed weight
- Baconer, a market pig between 65 kg (143 lb) and 80 kg (180 lb) dressed weight. The maximum weight can vary between processors.
- Grower, a pig between weaning and sale or transfer to the breeding herd, sold for slaughter or killed for rations.
- Finisher, a grower pig over 70 kg (150 lb) liveweight
- Butcher hog, a pig of approximately 100 kg (220 lb), ready for the market. In some markets (Italy) the final weight of butcher pig is in the 180 kg (400 lb) range. They tend to have hind legs suitable to produce cured ham
- Backfatter, cull breeding pig sold for meat; usually refers specifically to a cull sow, but is sometimes used in reference to boars

=== Groups ===
- Herd, a group of pigs, or all the pigs on a farm or in a region
- Sounder, a small group of pigs (or wild boar) foraging in woodland

=== Pig parts ===
- Trotters, the hooves of pigs (they have four hoofed toes on each foot, walking mainly on the larger central two)

=== Biology ===
- In pig, pregnant
- Farrowing, giving birth
- Hogging, a sow when on heat (during estrus)

=== Housing ===
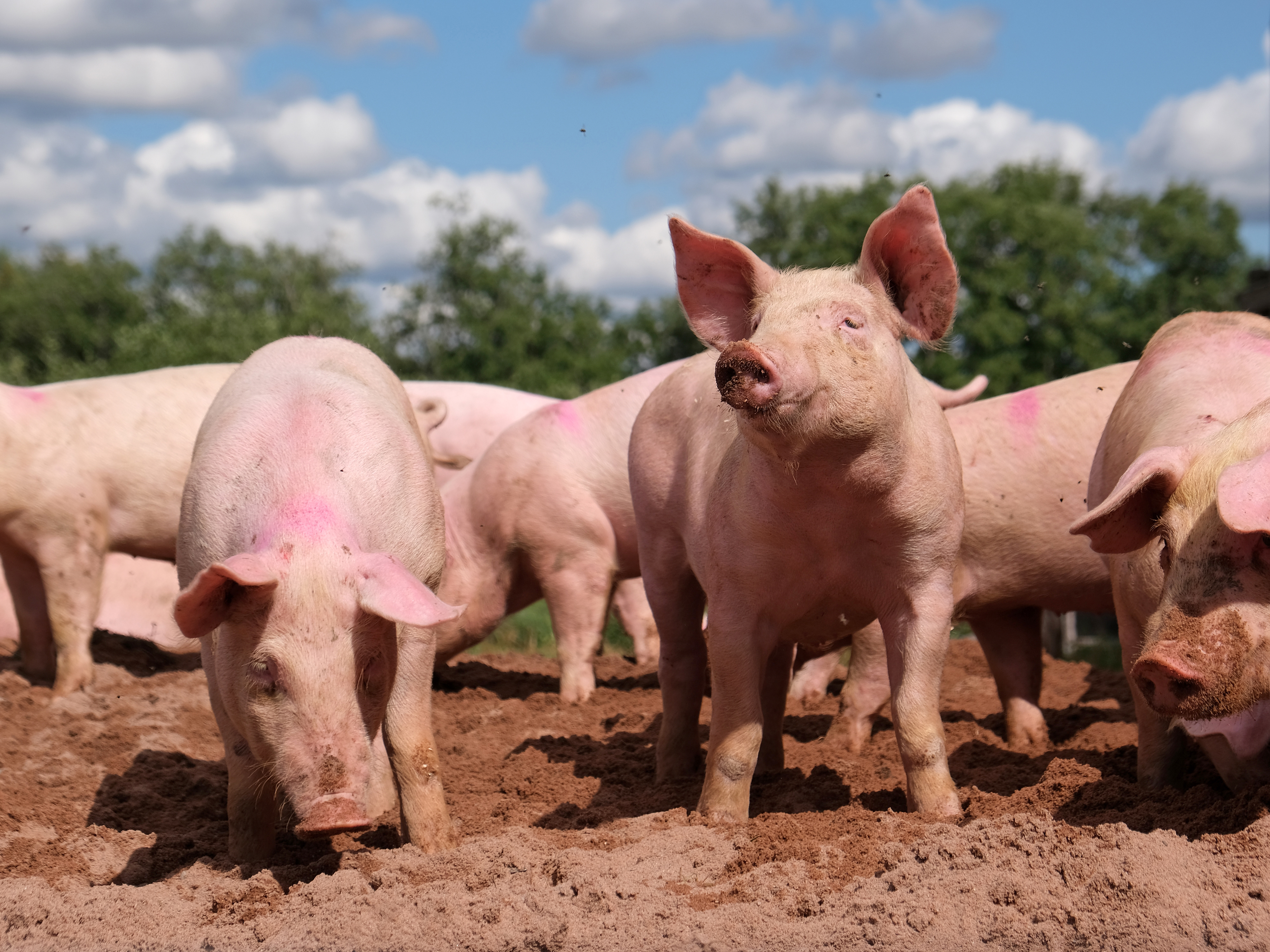
Pig farm in Vampula, Finland

- Sty, a small pig-house, usually with an outdoor run or a pig confinement
- Pig-shed, a larger pig-house
- Ark, a low semi circular field-shelter for pigs
- Curtain-barn, a long, open building with curtains on the long sides of the barn. This increases ventilation on hot, humid summer days

== Environmental and health impacts ==
Feces and waste often spread to surrounding neighborhoods, polluting air and water with toxic waste particles. Waste from swine on these farms carry a host of pathogens and bacteria as well as heavy metals. These toxins can leach down through the soil into groundwater, polluting local drinking water supplies. Pathogens can also become airborne, polluting the air and harming individuals when ingested. Contents from waste have been shown to cause detrimental health implications, as well as harmful algal blooms in surrounding bodies of water. Due to Concentrated Animal Feed Operations (CAFOs), those who live in the surrounding areas of pig farms tend to experience health complications. Symptoms included headaches, nausea, and weakness due to the fumes that are emitted from these farms. Those who work directly inside these farms often experience these symptoms more intensely. Typically, workers of these farms experience respiratory issues such as wheezing, coughing, and tightness of the chest as well as eye and nasal irritation. This is in part due to the air quality being poor because of the air particles being contaminated with hog feces.

Little to no regulation has been written by the EPA and federal legislators surrounding CAFOs to protect the welfare of both the environment and humans from their impacts. The only permit required by federal law on wastewater runoff by CAFOs is the National Pollutant Discharge Elimination System (NPDES) permit. NPDES are authorized under the Clean Water Act and aim to reduce dumping of pollutants in water systems. However, one of the most detrimental waste management practices used at swine farms, manure lagoons, have little to no regulations surrounding waste management, as they are not connected to a moving water source and therefore is not seen as an imminent threat to human or environmental health.

== Occupational hazards ==
Common occupational hazards faced by pig farmers include but are not limited to exposure to toxic gases and particulate matter. The Occupational Safety and Health Administration or OSHA sets health and safety standards for hazardous substances in the workplace called permissible exposure limits or PELs. Specific PELs exist for toxic gases and particulate matter and these standards are legally enforced by OSHA to ensure that the safety and health of workers are protected.

=== Toxic gas and particulate matter exposure ===
Toxic gases can accumulate to dangerous levels in pig barns

Toxic gases including hydrogen sulfide, ammonia, methane and carbon dioxide are produced as a result of the decomposition of pig waste and these gases become highly concentrated in enclosed spaces of pig barns which can be hazardous to health when inhaled. Carbon monoxide is another commonly associated toxic gas that can accumulate in pig barns as a result of the trapping of combustion byproducts such as malfunctioning furnaces or gas heat sources in the absence of adequate ventilation.

Hydrogen sulfide gas has a foul, "rotten eggs" smell at low concentrations but paralyzes the olfactory nerve at higher concentrations so that no smell is sensed. Exposure to high levels, well beyond the OSHA PEL, of hydrogen sulfide can cause fatal respiratory paralysis. The common source of hydrogen sulfide are covered manure pits below the pig barns that act as feces reservoirs. These manure pits require regular emptying and during this process, high levels of hydrogen sulfide is released and seeps into pig barns. Pig barns must be void of any human or animal inhabitants during this emptying process and require a several hour "waiting period" until occupants can safely reenter the barn.

Ammonia gas has a strong odor that can be smelled at low levels, below the OSA PEL, but does not have any negative health effects. At higher levels, ammonia is irritating to the body's mucous membranes such as the eyes, nose, mouth, throat and lungs. Particulate matter in pig barns often absorbs ammonia as it floats through the air. These particles are then inhaled and increase the irritating effect of ammonia.

Decomposition of pig waste produces methane and other combustible gases meaning that they can burn, catch fire or explode easily. some of these gases such as carbon dioxide and methane are also known as chemical asphyxiants and at high levels can cause suffocation by displacing oxygen from the air.

Particulate matter is produced when small fragments of pig hair or skin, dried feces, or feed can detach and become suspended in the air in pig barns. The increased concentration of particulate matter in the air, especially in confined spaces, can lead to respiratory tract irritation and other health effects when inhaled. Bacteria and viruses, such as influenza, can travel through the air on particulate matter and increase the risk of transmission of disease.

OSHA requires that toxic gas and particulate matter be measured at least twice yearly preferably in the autumn months and again in the winter when natural ventilation is the most reduced. Workers are also advised to wear N-95 respirators and eye protection when inside of pig barns to prevent the inhalation of toxic gases and particulate matter as well as irritation to the eyes.

== Geopolitical issues ==
As with other commodities, pork presents challenges in the politics of international trade as national interests compete and seek economic modus vivendi. Changes to policy can upset the existing balances, prompting economic anxiety. For example, in 2020, the hog farming sector in Taiwan was upset by a decision to allow imports from the United States without labeling of ractopamine use. Farmers' views varied on how negative the effects might be. Issues of pride and degree of autarky also figure into such debates; people understandably wonder whether trade competition changes will deeply damage domestic production capability, while accurate quantitative answers are often difficult to find amid the mass of debate.

== Drugs ==
=== Growth promoters ===
==== Ractopamine ====
Most pigs in the US receive ractopamine which promotes muscle instead of fat, quicker weight gain, and reduced costs and pollutants in the environment. Such pigs consume less feed to reach finishing weight and produce less manure. Ractopamine has not been approved for use by the European Union, China, Russia, and several other countries.

==== Colistin ====
China once used colistin (an antibiotic) as growth promoter (subtherapeutic antibiotic use) but discovered a colistin-resistant form of E. coli bacteria in a pig from a Shanghai farm in 2013. Investigations then led to the identification of "a gene called MCR-1 that allowed bacteria to survive colistin treatment in animals and humans." In 2016, these findings led China to ban colistin as growth promoter.

=== Antibiotics ===
A systematic review found that penicillins and tetracyclines were the most commonly used antibiotics in pigs.

== Parasites ==
Toxoplasmosis is a constant pressure on pig farming. Worldwide, the percentage of pigs harboring viable Toxoplasma gondii parasites has been measured to be 3 % to 71.43 %. Surveys of seroprevalence (T. gondii antibodies in blood) are more common, and such measurements are indicative of the high relative seroprevalence in pigs across the world. Neonatal piglets have been found to suffer the entire range of severity, including progression to stillbirth. This was especially demonstrated in the foundational Thiptara et al. 2006, reporting a litter birth of three stillborns and six live in Thailand. This observation has been relevant not only to that country but to toxoplasmosis control in porciculture around the world.

== Hygiene ==
Excessively hygienic raising conditions were found to prevent proper gut microbiota development by Schmidt et al. 2011. Moore et al. 1995 describes the pathology of Cryptosporidium infection, a common difficulty in piglet production.

In an attempt to curb diseases such as African swine fever, a number of Chinese companies have built condominium-style mega complexes multiple stories high to house thousands of pigs. The buildings have been dubbed "hog hotels" and come with strict protocols and advanced cleaning, veterinary, and disposal systems. However, doubt has been raised by policy specialists and animal scientists over the facilities' efficacy in preventing outbreaks. The welfare of the animals has also been a source of concern, and it has been suggested that the poor welfare of the pigs may cause a decline in their immunity.

== Industry overview ==
As of 2024, Smithfield Foods is the largest pig producer in the world, with a particularly large presence in the United States.

Large corporations often contract out the farming to focus on processing, packaging, and marketing; in 2024, Smithfield Foods sold some pig farming operations to Murphy Farm Management, making Murphy one of the largest pig producers in the United States with the capacity to produce 3.2 million hogs per year.

== See also ==
- Pig
- Boar–pig hybrid, Iron Age pig
- Domestic pig
- Extensive farming
- History of animal husbandry
- Intensive pig farming
- List of pig breeds
- Miniature pig
- Pig toilet
- Pig slaughter
- Savaging
- Small Hog Operation Payment
- Sow-piglet separation
- Feedback (pork industry)
