= Segregated early weaning =

Early separation of piglet and mother

Segregated early weaning (SEW) or isowean is a widely used process in pig farming of separating piglets and mothers and weaning the piglet early. This is typically within 7 to 21 days of birth. Without human intervention, sows are observed to wean their piglets at around 60-137 days old. The aims of SEW are to improve the profitability of pig farming and to reduce disease risk. SEW is associated with several negative impacts on piglet's welfare and increased mortality rates. This practice is used around the world.

== Effects on Piglets ==
Early separation is known to increase indicators of stress in pigs. Nosing and flank biting rates are higher after early separation. Early weaning has been linked to negative impacts on stress and negative impacts on the digestive system. Additionally, more recent research has found early weaning linked to increased piglet mortality rates, increased diarrhea levels, reduced growth rates, and worse spatial memory.

After separation, piglets are typically transported further away. This is believed to add to the stresses from weaning and separation. In North America, this entails millions of early weaned piglets being transported for usually 4 to 20 hours. Longer transport times increase the risk of dehydration. High or low temperatures in transit result in increased stress. Food and water are often not given during transit, leading to increased stress and health impacts.

== Global use ==
The majority of pig farms globally use segregated early weaning. In North America, this typically takes place within 19–22 days after birth. In the United States, this is typically at 21 days old with no legal minimum. In Canada, this is typically around 16-17 days old. As of 2026, the European Union limits separation of piglets to no earlier than 28 days old.

Piglets are often transferred across borders after separation. As of 2023, every week around 120,000 separated piglets from Canada are sent to US pig farms.

== History ==
Before the development of SEW, piglets were typically weaned at 30 days old and often raised in the same building for their whole life before slaughter. SEW was first developed in the early 1980s. The initial technique was done earlier at 5-10 days old and with medication, sometimes being referred to as medicated early weaning (MEW). The initial goal of the research was to produce pigs that were pathogen free. Neither MEW nor SEW succeeded in fully eliminating pathogens.

As modern pig farming has gotten larger, it has become more difficult to remove diseases. Separating pigs in general has been said to help minimize impacts of disease but make it more difficult for widespread immunity to occur. There were some early successes at using SEW for reducing transmission of specific pathogens, but some researchers have suggested the longer-term effects of very early separation were understudied. Later research found increases to piglet mortality with earlier separation and a reduced rate of piglet growth.

While initially focused on disease risk, the technique has spread, in part, due to its ability to make expanding pig farms cheaper. When farms get larger, they can avoid having to pay the upfront and labor costs for managing piglets. One modeling study in 2001 put the costs overall lower for SEW compared to prior pork production models.

The term isowean was originally a trademark of Pig Improvement Corporation. The trademark was canceled in 2002 and is now used to refer to the broader practice.

== See also ==
- Cow-calf separation
- Feedback (pork industry)
- Gestation crate
