= Feedback (pork industry) =

Practice used in the pork industry

Feedback is a common practice used in the pork industry where infected deceased pigs and their manure are fed to breeding pigs. It is also called controlled oral exposure or sometimes oral controlled exposure. It is done in an attempt to make the breeding pigs garner some degree of immunity to circulating diseases. There is no standard protocol, resulting in some swine researchers calling the procedure potentially risky and noting that it is often done in an unsafe manner. The practice has also been criticized by animal welfare and animal rights groups calling it disturbing and/or unethical.

== History ==
Feedback appears to have been originally researched in the 1950s. In the decades since, its usage in the pork industry has become widespread due to increases in the pork industry's size and increases in overcrowding. The change in the industry's size has led to a growing spread in diseases such as PEDv. A lack of effective vaccines for these diseases in the past led to feedback being used in their place.

However, feedback usage extends beyond diseases where vaccines do not yet exist. In 2012, while 45% of large US herds vaccinated young female pigs against PRRS, 26.6% used feedback (or did so in addition).

== Global usage ==
The usage of feedback is not limited to just one country or region. Widespread usage has been recorded in at least the 2010s in places such as the United States, Taiwan, Belgium, Japan, South Korea, Thailand, and more. Additionally, following a PEDv outbreak in the 1970s, feedback was commonly used across Europe.

Some countries recommend against the practice, but those recommendations are not always followed. For instance, the Japanese government has issued guidelines that discourage the use of feedback. However, one report found that over half of the studied farms that were exposed to PEDv in the Kagoshima and Miyazaki prefectures used feedback.

== Controversy ==
Some veterinarians such as Jim Reynolds recommend against its use due to the risk of exposing pigs to more diseases than intended. The Humane Society of the United States has called the practice "beyond disturbing" and that its use is indicative of the rise of intensive pig farming. The Animal Legal Defense Fund has called it "disgusting, unethical and unlawful" and has filed a lawsuit against one pig farm for its use.

== See also ==
- Variolation – former immunization method with similar concept
- Ventilation shutdown – often used during disease outbreaks to mass-kill
- Foam depopulation – also often used to mass-kill during disease outbreaks
- Segregated early weaning – early split of piglet and mother, initially for claimed disease reduction but also for economics
