= Pig milk =

White liquid produced by the mammary glands of female pigs

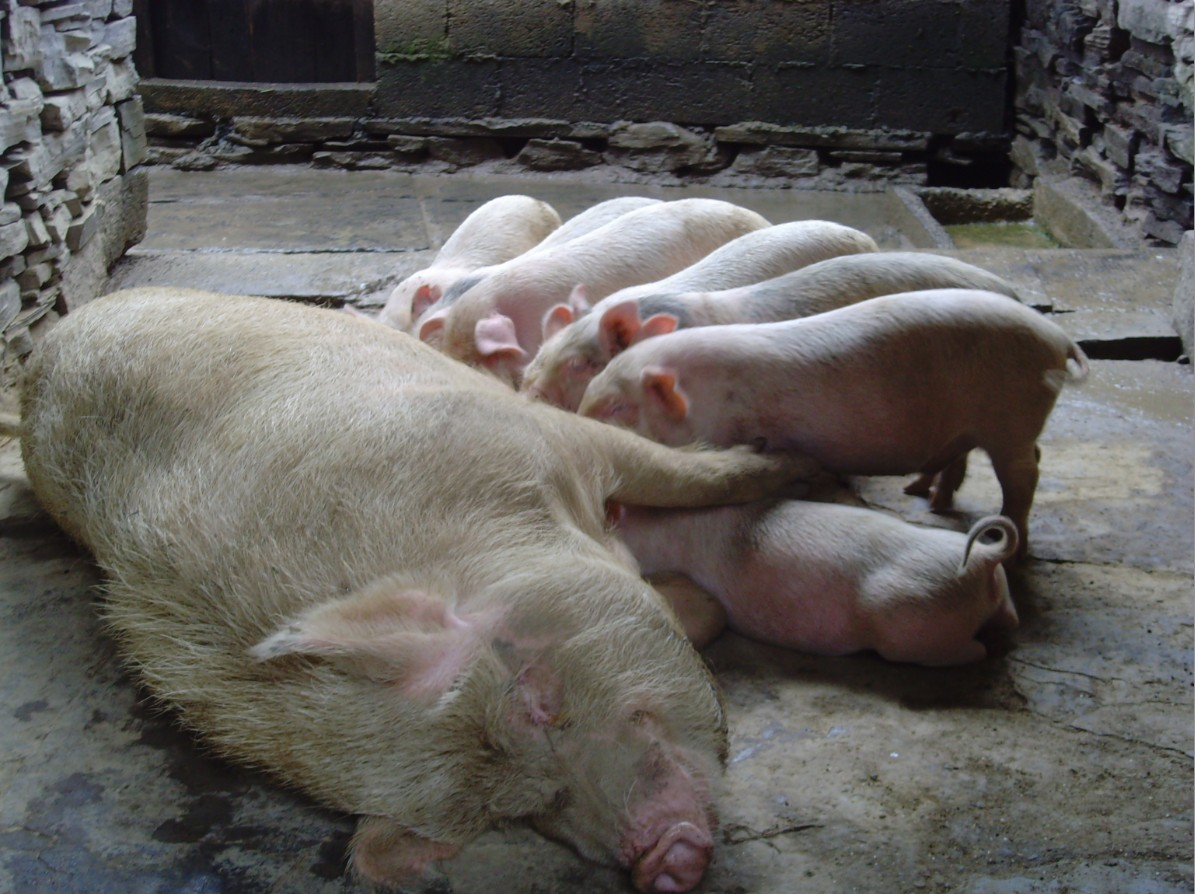
Piglets consuming pig milk

Pig milk is typically consumed by piglets. It is similar in composition to cow's milk, though higher in fat and more watery. Pig milk is seldom obtained for human uses and is not considered to be a viable agricultural product. Several attempts have been made to produce pig milk cheese, some of which have been successful.

== Description ==
Pig milk contains 8.5% fat compared to 3.5% in cow's milk. It has similar colostrum composition in terms of protein, fat, and lactose, when compared to cow's milk. Pigs with high-protein diets produce more milk compared to those on low-protein diets. It has also been described as more gamey than goat's milk and seems more watery than cow's milk.

== Difficulty in milking pigs ==
Pig milk is not considered suitable for commercial production for a number of reasons. Pigs are considered difficult to milk. The sow herself is reluctant to be milked, may be uncooperative or become spooked by human presence, and lactating pigs may be quite aggressive. Sows have 8 to 16 small nipples, each giving little milk for a short duration. A pig's milking time can be around fifteen seconds compared to ten minutes for a cow. A sow may produce only 13 pounds of milk per day compared to a cow's production of 65 pounds. (Production has been estimated using a system of weighing piglets prior to and after suckling.) In addition, no existing milking machine is designed to attach to around a dozen teats and extract milk for 15 seconds. Finally, pigs, unlike cows, cannot become pregnant while lactating, which makes a pig-milk operation even less viable.

== Human uses ==
Compared to more conventional animals such as dairy cattle or goats, a main issue is their omnivorous diet. The flavor of pig milk has been described as "gamey", more so than goat's milk. The milk is also considered more watery than cow's milk.

=== Cheese ===
Cheese produced from pig milk has been described as having a concentrated and intensified flavor of pig milk. Chef Edward Lee prepared a ricotta cheese from pig milk, which he described as "delicious".

A Dutch farmer produced one of the first experimental pig milk cheeses. As many as ten people worked to milk the sows for dozens of hours. Several of the attempts to produce cheese failed. They finally managed to make a few kilograms. It was reported that it tasted "chalky and a little bit salty" and compared to other cheeses "saltier and creamier, yet grainier". The cheese was sold to an anonymous buyer at a children's charity for $2,300 per kilogram. The price fetched was higher than the most expensive variety known as pule cheese, which is made from the milk of the Serbian Balkan donkey.

=== Health and beauty ===
Susanna Montgomerie, Countess of Eglinton used to wash her face with pig milk. She recommended this treatment to others, as she believed it would help retain one's figure and complexion.

== Bibliography ==
- Hughes, E.H.; Hart, Hugh G. (August 11, 1934). "Production and Composition of Sow's Milk". University of California Davis, College of Agriculture, Division of Animal Husbandry.
