= Veterinary ethics =

Principles governing veterinary medicine

Veterinary ethics is a system of moral principles that apply values and judgments to the practice of veterinary medicine. As a scholarly discipline, veterinary ethics encompasses its practical application in clinical settings as well as work on its history, philosophy, theology, and sociology. Veterinary ethics combines veterinary professional ethics and the subject of animal ethics. The subject of veterinary ethics can be interpreted as an extension of critical thinking skills necessary to make the decisions in veterinary care in order to support the profession's responsibilities to animal kind and mankind. Five main topics construct the physical usage of Veterinary Ethics. The first is history which describes how these ethics came to be, and how they have changed in the modernization of the veterinary industry. The second is the relation veterinary ethics has with human medical ethics, which together share many values. Third, the principles of these ethics which are updated regularly by the AVMA. Fourth are the key topics of veterinary ethics, which describe what these ethics cover. Last, how these ethics are incorporated into everyday practice and also how they affect those employed in the industry.

== History ==
Animal welfare as a subject has been studied in great depth. It largely looks at the ways in which an animal may suffer in particular circumstances, or how their lives may be enriched. Animal ethics is another well-documented subject, and philosophers since Aristotle, have commented on its importance. Often referred to as “the animal problem,’ the questions that seem to be asked in this field are at their foundation trying to determine what the morally relevant difference is between animals and humans, and if there is no difference how do we justify treating animals a certain way, and if there is a difference then what is it about this difference that allows us to treat animals in a certain way.

Veterinary ethics is a modern subject that does not have a defined start point. As it combines the study of animal welfare and animal ethics as its root and uses information from this as data for its deliberations it could be said to have a long history, however as an academic discipline it is only recently that works have been published on the topic.

The two academics who have written on veterinary ethics for the longest time are Bernard Rollin (Colorado State University) and Jerrold Tannenbaum (University of California, Davis). More recently, emergency veterinarian Jessica Fragola wrote in 2022 about the ethics of animal triage, with pressures on veterinarians having been exacerbated by staffing shortages that resulted from the COVID-19 pandemic, coupled with growth in spending on veterinary care and on pet insurance. They can be seen as the founders of the subject in veterinary ethics. Currently, most veterinary schools teach veterinary ethics, and it is often combined in teaching with animal welfare or with law.

== Relation with medical ethics ==
The subject is very similar to that of human medical ethics, in that the study of the relationship between the doctor and the patient relates closely to that of the veterinary surgeon and animal owner. However, the subject differs greatly in the consideration of the uses of animals - while a doctor's duty may be to preserve life at nearly all cost, the veterinary surgeon needs to adapt their attitude to health and longevity of life to the purpose of the animal (e.g., farm animals).

Much of what is understood in the field of professionalism and professional responsibilities in confidentiality, preserving autonomy, beneficence, truth-telling, whistleblowing, informed consent, and communication is largely lifted from the research done in the medical profession. The difference between human patients and animal patients does not interfere with the professional discussion between doctors and human patients and vets with their clients.

Another major difference between veterinary ethics and human medical ethics is the interplay with law. Human medical ethics has driven changes in the law and, to a lesser degree, vice versa. Largely involving cases of human rights a wide-ranging variety of high-profile legal challenges in many countries have involved the use of ethics to encourage changes in law (for example, assisted suicide, abortion, duty of care, rights to refuse treatment). Veterinary ethics does not have such a strong interplay. It is rare to have an animal-based legal challenge reach high into the legal system. Cases involving challenges to professionalism and duty of care are largely dealt with via the veterinary governing bodies.

The veterinary profession remains largely self-regulating across the world (e.g., by the RCVS in the United Kingdom and AVMA in the United States). This has caused some controversy as to why the veterinary profession remains one of the few remaining self-regulating professions. Bernard Rollin wrote on the difficulty in keeping public confidence while remaining self-regulating; trust and impartiality are critical, but most important is the need for a profession to be self-sacrificial by putting the client's needs above that of the profession or professional.

“Every profession—be it medicine, law, or agriculture—is given freedom by the social ethic to pursue its aims. In return, society basically says to professions it does not understand well enough to regulate, “You regulate yourselves the way we would regulate you if we understood what you do, which we don’t. But we will know if you don’t self-regulate properly and then we will [hammer you with draconian rules and] regulate you, despite our lack of understanding.”

== Principles ==
The American Veterinary Medical Association (AVMA) regularly reviews and updates its principles of ethics. The AVMA Judicial Council ensures the principles are current. Much like the human medical code, veterinarians are expected to "adhere to a progressive code of ethical conduct". Overall there are eight main principles, covering areas such as competence, animal welfare, the veterinarian-client-patient relationship, standards of professionalism, honesty, compliance with the law, continuing education, acting within boundaries of competence, and the betterment of public health.

== Incorporation into everyday practice ==
One of the most important reasons veterinary ethics are taught to veterinarians is to expose these individuals to the willingness and responsibility they will need to be understanding of achieving with the cases they are exposed to. Veterinary ethics prepares veterinarians and veterinary staff for adequate and professional conversations with clients, and other professionals. Signatures for treatment plans and invoices are also the result of these ethics, as legal cases have gotten involved. Another important subject that these ethics prepare veterinary staff for is discussing with the actual clients about their recommended treatment for the client's pet. This is very important training that veterinarians will go through while in school. Determining the best treatment plans and outcomes, while also communicating these to the clients to keep them understanding is the only way to practice veterinary medicine.

Although these ethics provide a safe environment for the animals being treated, the work environment for veterinarians and staff is not always desired. The COVID-19 pandemic (as mentioned above) has brought a significant number of new patients to hospitals all over the world, while schools are producing staff at a rate that cannot keep up with the animal population growth. The large growth in an industry that is not staffed sufficiently has led many hospitals to overwork staff leading to burnout. Statistics prove that from the beginning of the pandemic in January 2020 to the time when businesses began opening again, financial growth reached up to 11%. Significant growth requires additional work, keeping up with patient flow, cleaning, and managing. With limited individuals meeting employment requirements, it has been hard for the industry to keep up.

== Key topics ==
Key topics within veterinary ethics include:

- Complementary and alternative medicine
- Confidentiality
- Cosmetic interventions
- Euthanasia
- Informed consent
- Negligence
- Non-therapeutic mutilations
- Professionalism and professional regulation
- Religious influences
- Research ethics
- Selective breeding
- Triage

== See also ==
- Universities Federation for Animal Welfare
