= Grass =

Herbaceous plant with grassy morphology

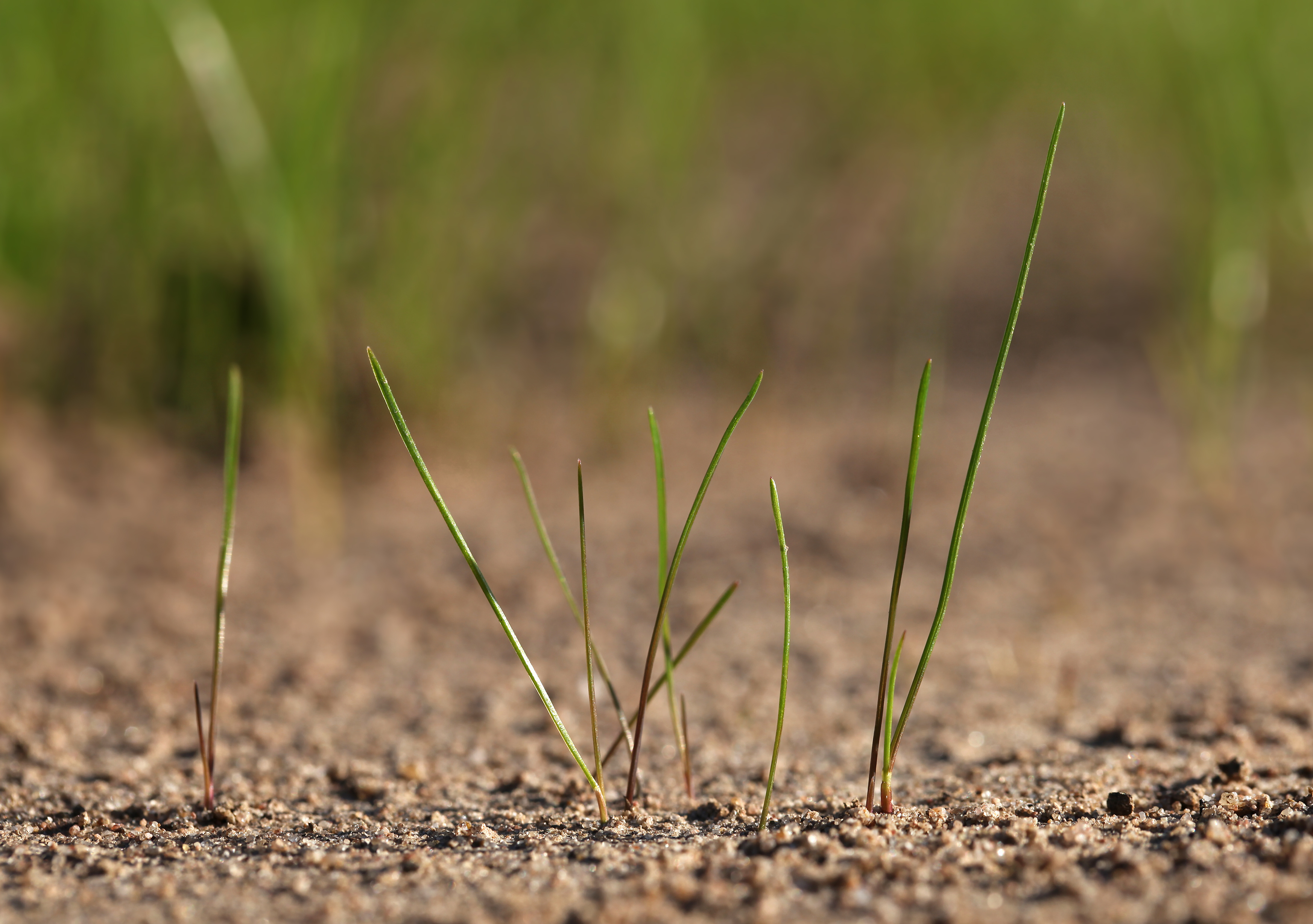
Germinating fescue grass with long, blade-like leaves

Grass refers to various families of plants, with the grouping defined by either apperance or use. In the strictly biological sense, true grasses are plants of the family Poaceae. In folk taxonomy, the word defines a much broader set of small non-woody plants with narrow leaves.

== Terminology ==
The words built around the concept of "grass" have separate technical meanings in different fields of study. Both biology and agriculture in a strict sense use word grass for plants of the family Poaceae, "true grasses". A variety of terms are applied to plants that look (or are used) like true grass, but are not grasses in the biological sense. Plants that only look like grasses are called grass-like. The term covers herbaceous monocots, in most cases classified as sedges (Cyperaceae) or rushes (Juncaceae). In botany and ecology, the term graminoid refers to a herbaceous plant (without woody stems) with a grass-like morphology, i.e., elongated culms with long, blade-like leaves.

Non-grass-like plants that are still lumped together as "grass" by appearance are herbaceous plants: forbs, broad-leaved herbaceous dicots, which include the herbaceous legumes (the legume family, Fabaceae, is not defined by growth form and also contains shrubs and trees).

An international terminology for grazing lands, published in 2011 by a committee appointed by the International Grassland Congress and the International Rangeland Congress, distinguishes two kinds of grasses: tussock grasses, which grow in upright clumps and produce tillers only, and creeping grasses, which spread by stolons or rhizomes.

In addition to appearance, vegetation in agriculture is classified by its use, with different terms grouping together a wide variety of plants that can be used, like grass, as forage. For example, herbage is a common word for above-ground parts of herbaceous plants taken together (grasses, grass-like plants, herbaceous legumes and other forbs), but without separated grain. Forage is even wider: any edible plant parts, without separated grain, that grazing animals can feed on or that can be harvested for feeding, including browse, the leaves and twigs of woody plants. A sward is a community of herbaceous plants of short growth that covers the ground more or less continuously, including their roots.

Grassland has the broadest meaning of these words. As a managed grazing land it is treated as a synonym of pastureland, and its vegetation is understood to include legumes and other forbs alongside grasses, sometimes with woody plants. Natural grassland is dominated by grasses and other herbaceous species.

== Folk taxonomy ==
"Grass" also refers to a category in folk classification of plants. Anthropology includes it into "life-forms", a small number of very broad plant groupings. Cecil H. Brown went through the plant vocabularies of 105 languages in 1977 and concluded that only five life-forms turn up in every major inhabited environment: "tree", "herb", "bush", "vine" and "grass". What puts a plant in one of them, he argued, is its general shape, and not what it is used for, where it grows or the season in which it appears; a "grass" is simply a small non-woody plant with narrow leaves, often blade-like or spear-shaped.

Brown also suggested that languages pick up the life-form words in a fixed order. "Tree" always comes first. A catch-all word for all small non-woody plants comes second (Brown coined the term "grerb"). In places where most small plants are grasses, the catch-all word may itself be translated as "grass". In most cases grasses then split off from the other herbs under a name of their own.

In 1984, Robert Randall and Eugene Hunn argued that the broad plant categories are often defined as much by usefulness, or the lack of it, as by shape, with Brown counter-arguing in the same year. Scott Atran, writing in 1985, took Brown's side on the question of usefulness. Life-forms, as he saw it, are not sorted by what plants are good for but by where they stand in ordinary human surroundings, with tree tops above a person and grasses staying below.

== Plants ==
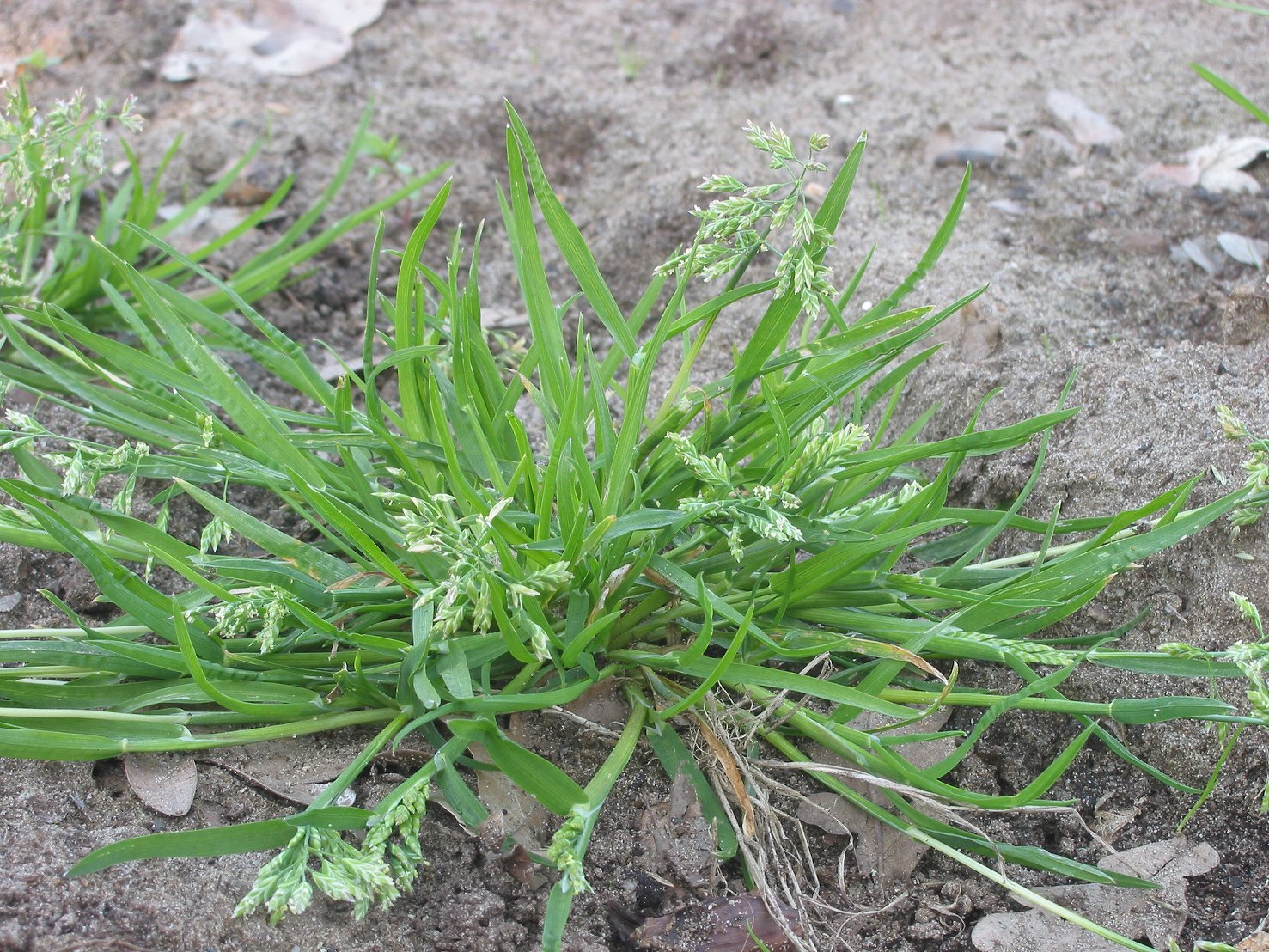
Poa annua, an annual grass

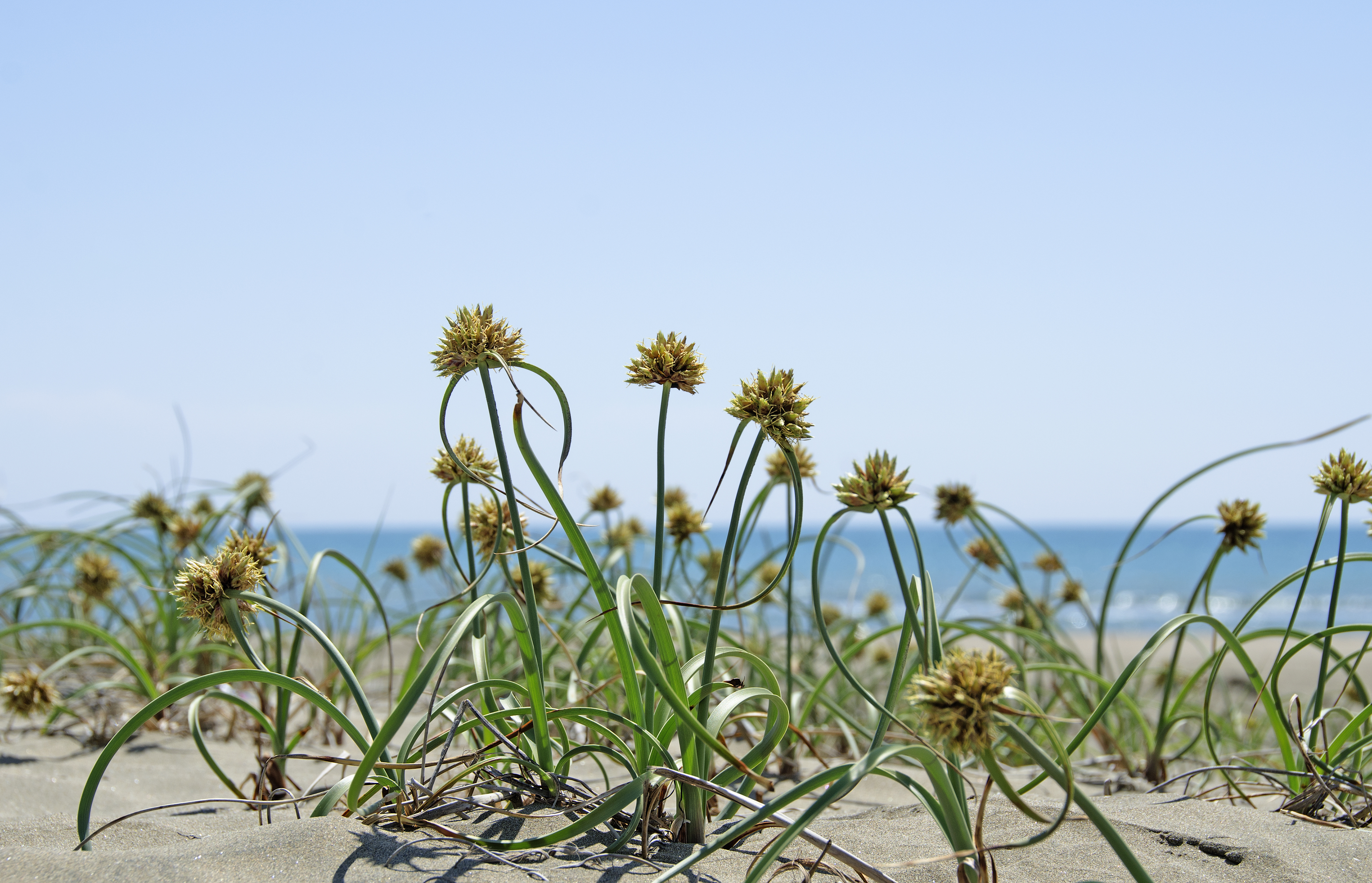
Nutsedge (Cyperus capitatus), Cyperaceae

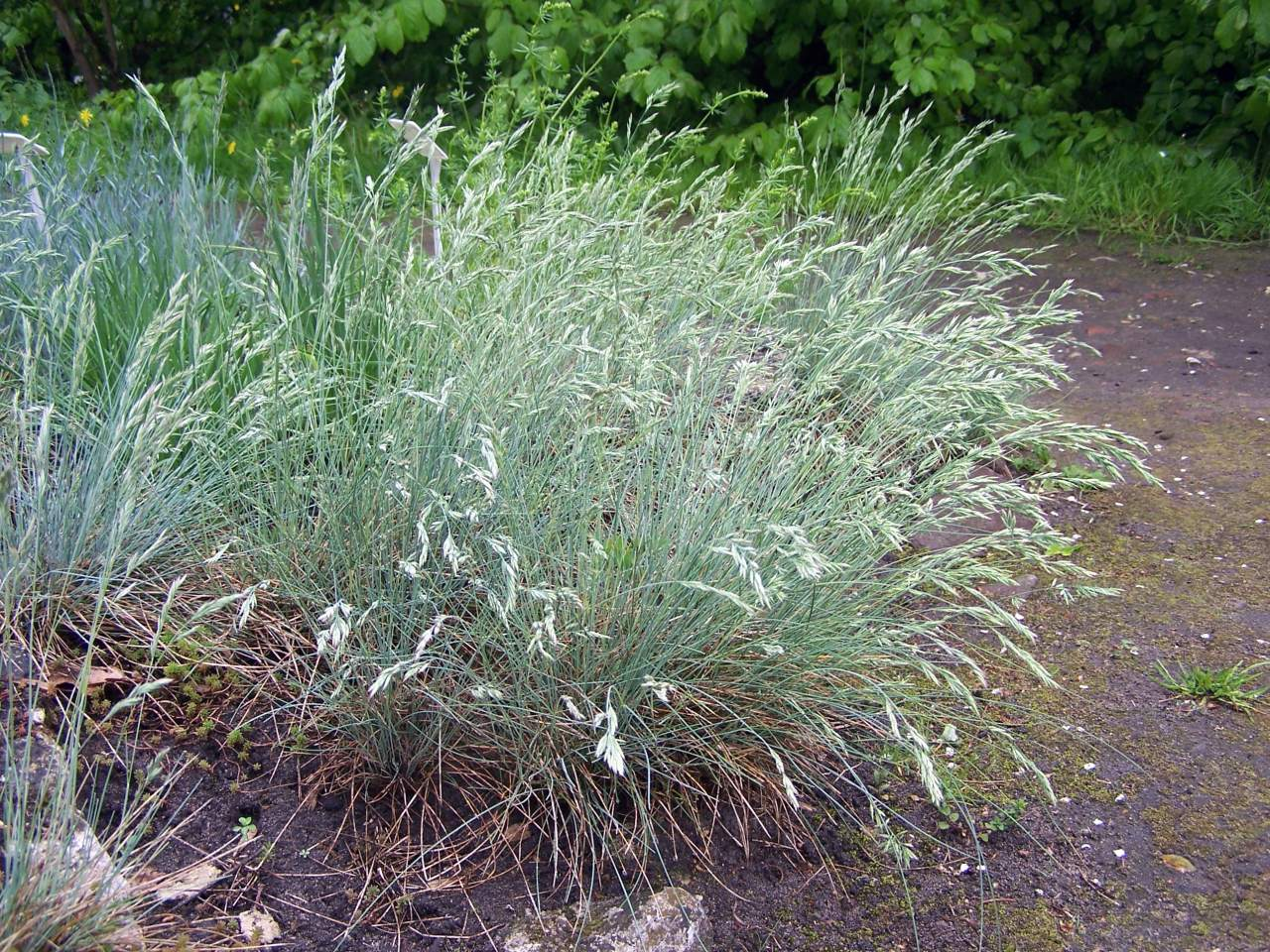
Festuca cinerea, Poaceae

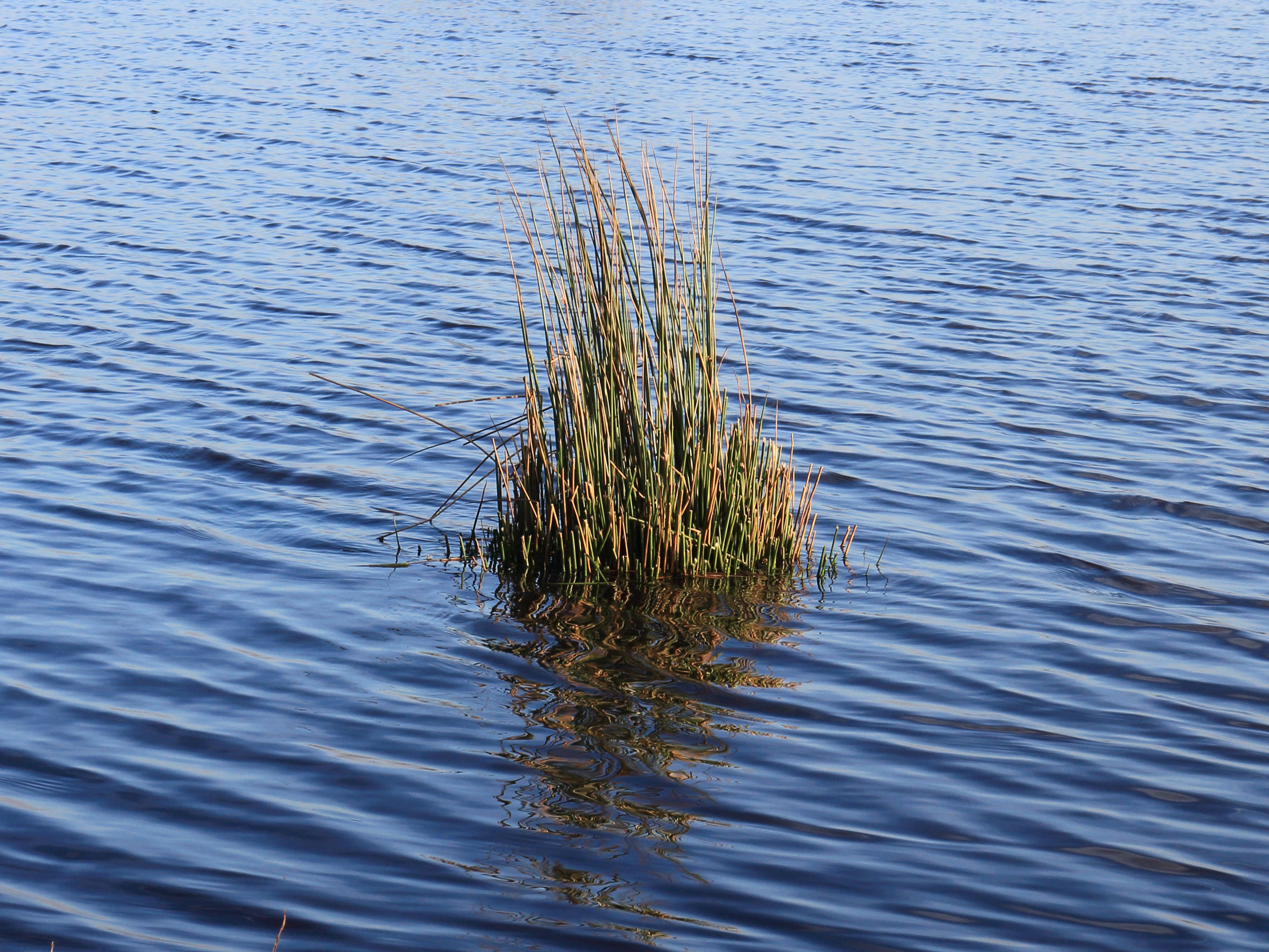
Soft rush (Juncus effusus), Juncaceae

The plants most often referred to include the families Poaceae (grasses in the strict sense), Cyperaceae (sedges), Juncaceae (rushes) and Restionaceae (restios). These are not closely related but belong to different clades in the order Poales. The grasses (Poaceae) are by far the largest family, with some 12,000 species.

== Common traits ==
A graminoid is a plant that has a simple structure of repeated parts that have their meristems, growing parts, within their stems. They frequently have well-developed ways of reproducing vegetatively, without needing to grow from pollinated seeds. As a group, the graminoids produce fewer toxins than other plants and instead rely on physical defenses against being eaten by herbivores. Their evolution has been in response to grazing by both mammals and insects.

== Ecology ==
Besides their similar morphology, graminoids share a widespread occurrence and often dominance in open habitats such as grasslands or marshes. They can, however, also be found in the understory of forests. Sedges and rushes tend to prefer wetter habitats than grasses.

== Usage ==
Grass can refer to a green area, such as a lawn, park, or a field, and is often used for recreation or for sports such as lawn tennis or bowls. Beginning in the 1970s, some sports venues have installed artificial grass/turf to reduce maintenance costs.

== Etymology ==
The word grass may have its origin in the Proto-Indo-European root *gʰreh₁-, meaning 'to grow'.

The word graminoid is derived from Latin grāmen 'grass; herb', with the suffix -oid denoting '-like; resembling, characteristic of'. The Latin gramen may be related to the English grass through a common word in the Proto-Indo-European language. However, grass is a Germanic word comparable to the Old Frisian gres or Old High German gras. In Old English it was gærsum which changed over time into the modern word. It was first spelled grass in 1393, but continued to be spelled variously through at least 1637.

== Memes ==
In internet slang, the phrase "touch grass" is used to tell someone to log off their computer or phone and go outside. It is commonly used as a joke or insult toward people who spend too much time online, especially in competitive video games or social media arguments.

== See also ==
- Green track
- Groundcover
- Lawn
- Sod
- Tapestry lawn
- Reed
- Seagrass

== Sources ==
- Allen, Vivien G.; Batello, Caterina; Berretta, Elbio J.; Hodgson, John; Kothmann, Mort; Li, Xianglin; McIvor, John; Milne, John; Morris, Craig; Peeters, Alain; Sanderson, Matt (2011). "An international terminology for grazing lands and grazing animals". Grass and Forage Science. 66 (1): 2–28. doi:10.1111/j.1365-2494.2010.00780.x.
- Atran, Scott (1985). "The nature of folk-botanical life forms". American Anthropologist. 87 (2): 298–315. doi:10.1525/aa.1985.87.2.02a00040. JSTOR 678563.
- Brown, Cecil H. (1977). "Folk botanical life-forms: their universality and growth". American Anthropologist. 79 (2): 317–342. doi:10.1525/aa.1977.79.2.02a00080. JSTOR 673843.
- Brown, Cecil H. (1984). "Life-forms from the perspective of Language and Living Things: some doubts about the doubts". American Ethnologist. 11 (3): 589–593. JSTOR 644636.
- Randall, Robert A.; Hunn, Eugene S. (1984). "Do life-forms evolve or do uses for life? Some doubts about Brown's universals hypotheses". American Ethnologist. 11 (2): 329–349. JSTOR 643854.

=== Books ===
- Gove, Philip Babcock, ed. (1981). Webster's Third New International Dictionary of the English language, Unabridged. Vol. I: A to G. Springfield, Massachusetts: G. & C. Merriam Co. ISBN 978-0-87779-201-7. OCLC 8838804.
- Jefferies, R.L. (1988). "13 : Vegetational mosaics, plant-animal interactions and resources for plant growth". In Gottlieb, Leslie D.; Jain, Subodh K. (eds.). Plant Evolutionary Biology (First ed.). London; New York: Chapman and Hall. ISBN 978-0-412-29290-3. OCLC 17233777.

=== Web ===
- "grass (n.1)". Oxford English Dictionary (online ed.). Oxford University Press. doi:10.1093/OED/6956138275. (Subscription or participating institution membership required.)
