= Sward =

Sward or Swärd may refer to:

== People ==
- Anne Swärd – Swedish writer
- Christian Swärd (born 1987), Swedish ice hockey player
- Daniel Swärd – Swedish footballer
- Marcia P. Sward (1939–2008), American mathematician and nonprofit organization administrator
- Melinda Sward (born 1979), American actress
- Robert Sward (born 1933), American and Canadian poet and novelist
- Tobias Swärd – Swedish actor (born 1986)

== Other uses ==
- Sward (grass), community of plants forming a mat of grass and grass roots
