= Continuous grazing =

Livestock grazing method in agriculture

Diagram of continuous grazing showing the low inputs and low outputs

In agriculture, continuous grazing is a method of grazing where livestock are given open unrestricted access to one open grazing area. This method, as opposed to rotational grazing, does not move livestock around a pasture but rather, allows them to graze continuously one location throughout the season. Continuous grazing has been a management practice for land managers for many years; it allows for less intense management style and less fencing in pastures, but can result in lower forage quality and limited quantity of livestock on the pasture.

== Advantages ==
The benefits of this approach is a large reason why it has been widely used as a management style. Continuous grazing requires very few initial costs. While rotational grazing requires the installation of extensive fencing to create paddocks for grazing, continuous grazing does not, thus it has a lower initial cost. Additionally, the labor required to upkeep continuously grazed land is minimal. An additional component to consider is that continuous grazing is often a traditional style of grazing so it can hold some social values. Continuous grazing can be an effective low maintenance grazing strategy and can be an effect way for cattle to graze if done responsibly.

== Disadvantages ==
Although continuous grazing is an effective management strategy when done well, it can be easy to overgraze the pasture with little to no rest on the land. Therefore, stocking amount for continuously grazed pasture must be suitable for the amount of land, which usually results in lower stocking and thus lower profits. Additionally, continuous grazing tends to lead to lower forage quality because the land is not allowed time to rest and recover properly. This can interfere with maximum animal growth, and reduced forage quality can impact the quality of goods animals produce, especially in dairy cows or other performance-based grazers. Lower forage quality and lower stocking rates can decrease returns in the long run. Continuous grazing can also create an uneven distribution of manure in the pasture which results in an uneven distribution of organic nutrients returning to the soil, which again can lead to the degradation of the land over time.

== Ecological impacts ==
Continuous grazing can have many ecological impacts. Continuous grazing can over exhaust plant communities, which decreases plant productivity. An alteration to natural plant productivity can have many implications for soil health. Soils rely on root systems to prevent erosion as well as cycle nutrients through the soil, therefore, if root healthy root systems are being broken due to overgrazing then the natural cycle of nutrient can be damaged. Erosion can also decrease the future productivity of the soil leading to a cycle of degradation. In addition, continuous grazing can lead to an increase in unpalatable plants because herds favor one plant over another, leading to imbalances in plant communities; typically, these unpalatable plants tend to disperse toxic or harmful chemicals into the soil, which also feeds into the cycle of degradation. Healthy soils facilitate proper water drainage preventing extensive runoff and allow deeper soils to receive adequate water. Soils are a fragile, yet crucial piece to maintaining healthy ecosystems, so overgrazing and high levels of disturbance affect the productivity and success ecological systems.

== Economics ==
Grazing style has many impacts on the costs and returns of ranches and land owners. The simplistic low cost approach of continuous grazing is a very attractive economic incentive for many land owners. It allows for immediate returns on animal productivity. Continuous grazing is an advantageous choice of grazing for temporary grazing, abundant land and, short run economic gains; allowing cattle to graze short term and with plenty of land would not lead degradation of pastures so continuous grazing would be an appropriate strategy to implement. However, with continuous grazing there can be challenges with long term returns. If land is overused plant quality and quantity can be reduced, which can result in less animal gains, which can be a challenge for maximizing economic returns. Thus, continuous grazing may not be an appropriate management strategy for long term or full season grazing or if land is not abundant.

== See also ==
- Rotational grazing
- Rangeland management
- Pyric herbivory
- Rangeland health
- Livestock grazing comparison
