= Sward (grass) =

Continuous cover of grasses and herbs bound together by their roots

A sward is a continuous cover of the ground by grasses and other herbaceous plants. The closed stand of plants and the mat of roots in the upper soil hold it together. The words turf and sod overlap with sward in meaning. In technical use a sward is the community of plants, turf is mown grass together with the upper layer of earth, and sod is a section cut from grassland.

== Terminology ==
English dictionaries define sward, turf and sod by means of one another. Sward comes from Old English sweard, "skin". In The American Heritage Dictionary a sward is land covered with grassy turf, or a lawn or meadow. The Century Dictionary gives the older sense of the word as a skin or covering, especially the hide of a beast. It defines the sward of land as "the grassy surface of land; turf; that part of the soil which is filled with the roots of grass, forming a kind of mat". A sward covered with green grass is called greensward.

The American Heritage Dictionary defines turf as a surface layer of earth containing a dense growth of grass and its matted roots. A turf is also a piece cut from that layer, or a piece of peat burned as fuel. Sod is a section of grass-covered surface soil held together by matted roots, or the ground itself, especially when covered with grass.

Technical glossaries define the words separately: a sward is the community of plants on grazing land, turf is mown grass taken together with the earth it grows in, and sod is turf cut for laying elsewhere.. The international terminology for grazing lands and grazing animals defines a sward as "a population or a community of herbaceous plants characterized by a relatively short habit of growth and relatively continuous ground cover, including both above- and below-ground parts". In the American Sod Producers Association's glossary, turf is "the live dense topgrowth of turfgrasses maintained at a specific height by frequent mowing, together with the thatch roots and upper stratum of earth". The same glossary defines sod as the grassy surface of the ground, or as a section cut from grassland with its top growth, thatch, rhizomes, roots and the soil clinging to it.

== Erosion ==
The plant cover of a sward intercepts raindrops and dissipates their kinetic energy. Litter and vegetation also reduce the soil's susceptibility to erosion by decreasing the velocity of runoff and binding the soil with roots. Rill erosion begins when the water concentrates in discrete flow paths. Gully erosion occurs where runoff is concentrated and protective vegetation is lacking.

A sward takes up more water and loses far less soil than bare ground. In rainfall tests on the Edwards Plateau of Texas, 55% of the water infiltrated under sod-forming grass and 25% on bare ground. The bare ground lost more than four times as much soil. On the Tibetan Plateau the firm turf of the alpine meadows, formed by winding roots below the surface, conserves water and soil. Erosion rates measured there fell as the plant cover rose. In a field experiment with meltwater on a meadow slope at the northern edge of the plateau, alluvial soil gave twice the runoff of the meadow and nearly seven times the sediment.

On steep grassland the plant cover or the topsoil can be lost in patches, which exposes the loose material beneath. These shallow eroded areas, known in southern Germany and Austria as Blaiken, measure between 2 and 200 m^{2}. They result from shallow landslides or from the movement of snow on the slope. Long rainfall or the quick melting of much snow can set them off, because both saturate the slope material with water.

== Grazing ==
Grazing firms the ground in proportion to its intensity. Intensive grazing increases soil compaction and lowers the water storage capacity of the soil in comparison with mowing, while the forage yield stays the same.

Extensive grazing with few animals lets them choose what they eat. A mosaic of closely grazed, lightly grazed and avoided patches forms in the sward. A doctoral study at the University of Göttingen tested whether such grazing raises the number of plant species. Over three years of continuous grazing with oxen, the botanical composition of the sward changed quickly, but the number of species did not. The author expected the number of species to respond later, as the structure of the sward became more varied.

In Switzerland the summer pastures of the mountains are important to agriculture, and they help to form a varied landscape that people value for recreation. Grazing always puts some load on the sward and the soil. A study of sixteen alpine pastures in Eastern Switzerland found small patches of erosion on almost every one, at places where the animals gather, such as stables, drinking troughs and milking places. There the sward can be destroyed, and the bare soil begins to erode. Large damage was rarer. It arose mainly where heavy animals grazed steep, wet slopes for several weeks. The sward was badly damaged along the cattle tracks, water stood in the hoof prints, and the slope became unstable. Small pieces of the tracks slid away first, and larger landslides could follow. For steep slopes the study recommends no heavy animals, no grazing on wet soil, short grazing periods and long rest periods.

== Soil life ==
The soil under a sward holds the soil life, or edaphon. It consists of all the organisms that live in the soil, apart from the roots of higher plants. These organisms mainly occupy the air-filled and water-filled spaces of the topsoil, which is rich in litter and humus. A single gram of soil from the rhizosphere of a plant can hold a billion bacterial cells. The soil flora also includes fungi, algae and lichens. The soil fauna includes nematodes, mites, springtails, myriapods, insects, earthworms, and burrowing vertebrates such as moles and voles. Many insects live in the soil only as larvae or pupae.

Earthworms dig burrows more than 2.5 m deep, which improve the movement of water and air in the soil. Burrowing vertebrates loosen and mix the upper soil layers. Fungi run through the soil with a widely branched mycelium.

== Transplanting ==
Roots, rhizomes or stolons and the soil that clings to them hold a piece of sod firmly together, so that it can be lifted and laid elsewhere. Sodding is a permanent erosion control practice that involves laying a continuous cover of grass sod on exposed soils. It is suited to lawns and golf courses, where prompt use and appearance are important, and to steeply sloped areas. The sod is machine-cut at a uniform soil thickness of 0.5–2 inches (1.3–5.1 cm), not including shoot growth or thatch. Sodding provides immediate vegetative cover and can stabilise areas where seeding is not an option. Erosion over well-sodded areas is minimal in all but the largest storms. New sod roots firmly into the soil in about 10 to 14 days.

== Surveying ==
Survey markers can be hidden by overgrowth, such as a sward that has closed over them. Descriptions of survey marks therefore give the distance and direction of the mark from nearby objects such as kerbs, posts and trees.

== Sources ==
- Allen, V. G.; Batello, C.; Berretta, E. J.; Hodgson, J.; Kothmann, M.; Li, X.; McIvor, J.; Milne, J.; Morris, C.; Peeters, A.; Sanderson, M. (2011). "An international terminology for grazing lands and grazing animals" (PDF). Grass and Forage Science. 66: 2–28. doi:10.1111/j.1365-2494.2010.00780.x.
- The American Heritage Dictionary of the English Language (5th ed.). HarperCollins. 2022.
- American Sod Producers Association (June 1972). "Directory of Sod Terms" (PDF). Weeds Trees and Turf. pp. 43–46, 49–50, 54.
- Bauer, Sam; Mugaas, Bob; Pedersen, Brad (2024). "Seeding and sodding home lawns". University of Minnesota Extension.
- The Century Dictionary. n.d – via Wordnik.
- "Grasnarbe" [Sward]. Deutsches Wörterbuch von Jacob Grimm und Wilhelm Grimm [German Dictionary by Jacob Grimm and Wilhelm Grimm] (in German). Vol. 8. 1958. col. 1994 – via Wörterbuchnetz, Trier Center for Digital Humanities.
- "Bodenbakterien" [Soil bacteria]. Kompaktlexikon der Biologie (in German). Heidelberg: Spektrum Akademischer Verlag. 2001.
- "Bodenorganismen" [Soil organisms]. Lexikon der Biologie (in German). Heidelberg: Spektrum Akademischer Verlag. 1999.
- National Geodetic Survey (28 September 2022). "Mark Descriptions Help". Survey Mark Recovery. National Oceanic and Atmospheric Administration.
- Natural Resources Conservation Service (December 2003). National Range and Pasture Handbook (PDF) (Revised ed.). United States Department of Agriculture, Natural Resources Conservation Service, Grazing Lands Technology Institute.
- Sahin, Nurdan (2005). Vegetationsentwicklung und Weideleistung von Grasland bei extensiver Beweidung mit Ochsen [Vegetation development and pasture performance of grassland under extensive grazing with oxen] (PDF) (Doctoral dissertation, University of Göttingen) (in German). Göttingen: Cuvillier. ISBN 3-86537-691-6.
- Shao, QuanQin; Xiao, Tong; Liu, JiYuan; Qi, YongQing (June 2011). "Soil erosion rates and characteristics of typical alpine meadow using ^{137}Cs technique in Qinghai-Tibet Plateau". Chinese Science Bulletin. 56 (16): 1708–1713. doi:10.1007/s11434-011-4477-0.
- Shi, Xiaonan; Zhang, Fan; Wang, Li; Jagirani, Muhammad Dodo; Zeng, Chen; Xiao, Xiong; Wang, Guanxing (June 2020). "Experimental study on the effects of multiple factors on spring meltwater erosion on an alpine meadow slope". International Soil and Water Conservation Research. 8 (2): 116–123. doi:10.1016/j.iswcr.2020.02.001.
- Sutter, Roman (December 2007). Erosion im Alpgebiet: Schlussbericht [Erosion in the alpine pasture area: final report] (PDF) (Report) (in German). Appenzell: Agricultura Ingenieurbüro Roman Sutter.
- United States Environmental Protection Agency (December 2021). Stormwater Best Management Practice: Sodding (PDF) (Report). United States Environmental Protection Agency, Office of Water. EPA-832-F-21-028LL.
- Verhonig, Patrick (2013). Einfluss einer mehrjährigen intensiven Kurzrasenbeweidung auf den Oberboden und die Grasnarbe [Effect of several years of intensive short-sward grazing on the topsoil and the sward] (Diplomarbeit) (in German). LFZ Raumberg-Gumpenstein.
- Wiegand, Christoph; Geitner, Clemens (2013). "Investigations into the distribution and diversity of shallow eroded areas on steep grasslands in Tyrol (Austria)". Erdkunde. 67 (4): 325–343. doi:10.3112/erdkunde.2013.04.03.
