= Pyric herbivory =

Pyric herbivory is the term for the interactions of fire with grazing on a grassland. These interactions can promote biodiversity and function of grasslands. Fire will increase the amount of grazing in a certain area, as grazing herbivores prefer the nutritious forage available in recently burned areas. Since herbivores do not prefer areas that have not been recently burned, fuel will accumulate in unburned areas. This causes those areas to burn more easily in the future. These interactions between fire and grazing across space and time are referred to as positive and negative feedbacks. These interactions create heterogeneity across the landscape. Pyric herbivory is important to ecosystems that have evolved with fire and grazing, such as grasslands.

== Mechanisms ==
Pyric herbivory occurs because burning produces early successional plants that are more palatable and nutritious than late successional plants. Because of this, herbivores prefer the forage that grows in recently burned areas. Herbivores will graze more in the recently burned areas, causing leaf litter to build up in unburned areas. This makes the unburned areas more prone to fire in the future. Once fire occurs in a new area, herbivores will start grazing in that area. This creates shifting patterns of grazing and fire across the landscape.

== Ecological importance ==
The shifting patterns of heterogeneity that are created by pyric herbivory change the number and type of plant species present in the area. This supports biodiversity of plants and wildlife in the area, restores and maintains ecosystem function, and aids in nutrient cycling. It especially increases the availability of nitrogen and phosphorus by converting litter into ash. A lack of disturbances such as fire and grazing can decrease biodiversity and soil function quality, as well as allow woody encroachment.

== Concerns ==
There is a concern that agricultural livestock production will not be maintained when using conservation management strategies because of a need to lower stocking rates. Pyric herbivory is a strategy that allows landowners to maintain stocking rates without losing livestock productivity and also improve the health of the grassland.

There are social factors involved in whether a landowner chooses to implement pyric herbivory. These factors include previous experience of the landowner, the landowner's perception of woody encroachment on the land, proximity to neighbors, and risk orientation. Previous experience applying pyric herbivory will increase the landowner's likelihood to apply it as a management strategy.

== See also ==
- Controlled burn
- Socio-ecological system
- Livestock grazing comparison
- Rangeland management
- Grassland degradation
- Ecological restoration
- Conservation grazing
