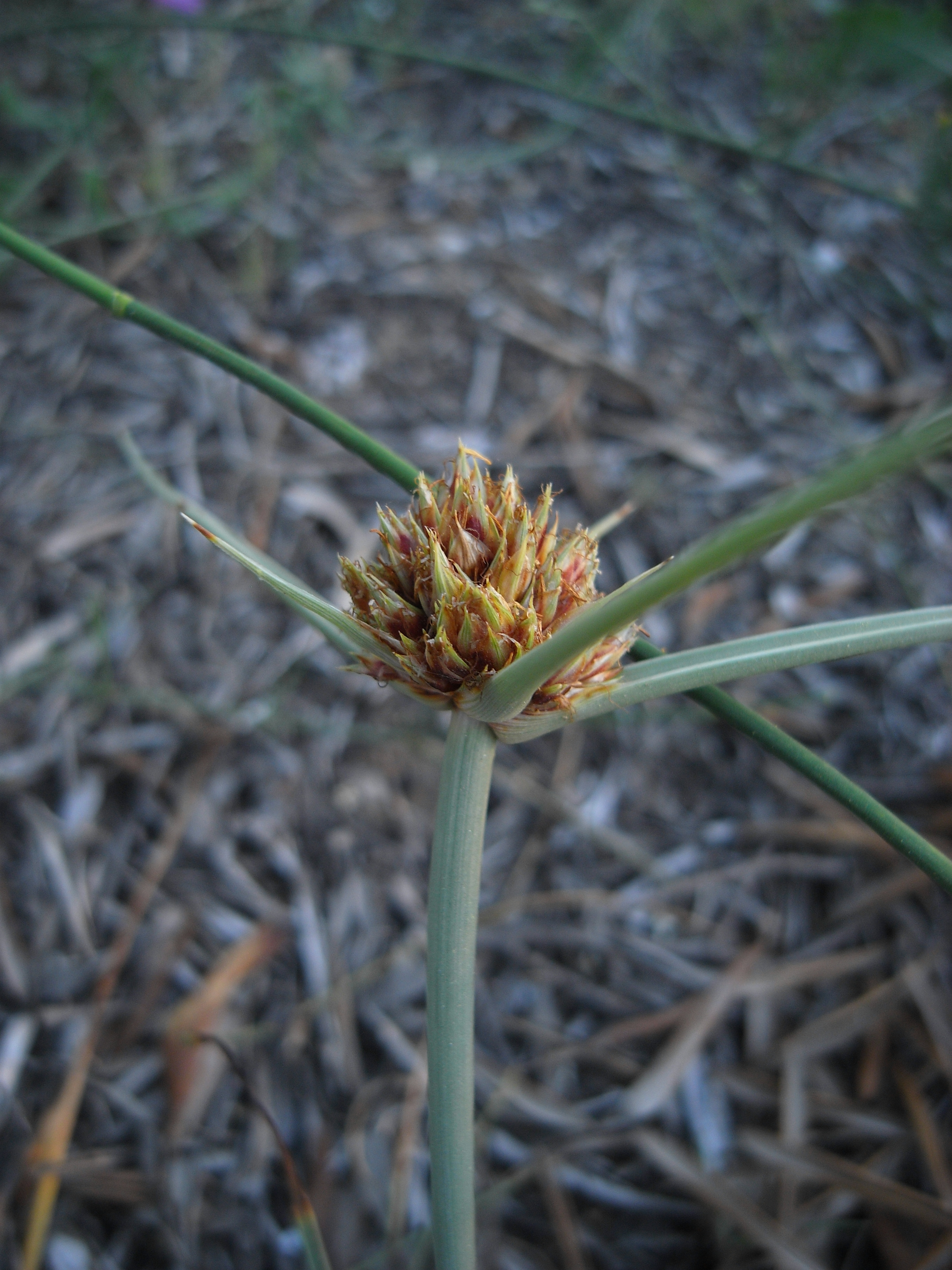

Scientific classification
- Kingdom: Plantae
- Clade: Tracheophytes
- Clade: Angiosperms
- Clade: Monocots
- Clade: Commelinids
- Order: Poales
- Family: Cyperaceae
- Genus: Cyperus
- Species: C. capitatus

Binomial name
- Cyperus capitatus Vand.

= Cyperus capitatus =

Species of sedge

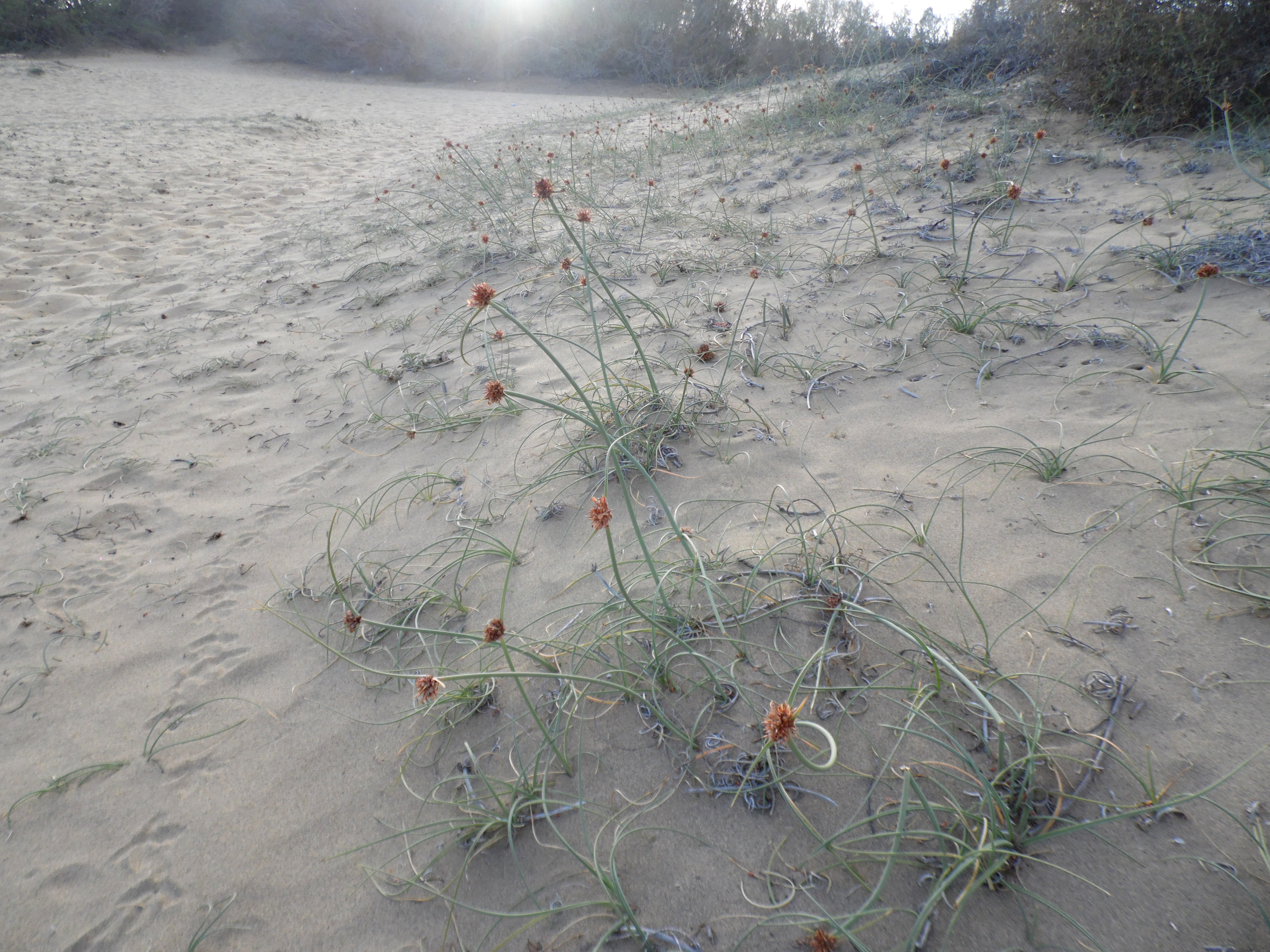
Colony in the sand

Cyperus capitatus, known as capitate galingale or sand galingale is a species of sedge that is native to coasts of the Mediterranean and close by; it has no subspecies.

It was first formally described by Domenico Vandelli in 1771.

== Description ==
An unmistakable Cyperus growing in coastal sands, spreading by scaly undersand roots, with leaves mostly at the stem base, that are large, thick, blue-grey and U-shaped (often both broad and narrow-curled ones), and with bracts under the flowers resembling the leaves but with widened bases. The flowers form a single agglomerated head of spikelets, with the floret glumes large, broad (5-8 x 2.5-4 mm), membraneous-edged, with conspicuous tip points (mucro 1-3 mm).

== Range and habitat ==
Mediterranean coastal sands, dunes and slacks and some coasts close by - Albania, Algeria, Baleares, Bulgaria, Canary Is., Cape Verde, Corse, Cyprus, East Aegean Is., Egypt, France, Greece, Italy, Kriti, Lebanon-Syria, Libya, Mauritania, Morocco, North Caucasus, Palestine, Portugal, Sardegna, Sicilia, Sinai, Spain, Tunisia, Turkey, Turkey-in-Europe, Western Sahara, Yugoslavia.

== See also ==
- List of Cyperus species
