= Christian Swärd =

Swedish ice hockey player

- Born: March 28, 1987 (age 37); Karlstad, SWE
- Height: 6 ft 3 in (191 cm)
- Weight: 194 lb (88 kg; 13 st 12 lb)
- Position: Forward
- Shoots: left
- SEL team: Free agent
- Playing career: 2005–present

Christian Swärd (born March 28, 1987, in Karlstad, Sweden) is a professional Swedish ice hockey player.

He is a free agent. He made his Swedish Elite League debut with Färjestads BK during the 2006/07 season, playing a total of 4 games and scoring 1 point. Swärd is not drafted by any NHL club.
