= Rangeland health =

The rangeland health refers to the degree to which the integrity of the soil and ecological processes of rangeland ecosystems are sustained. The attributes evaluated during rangeland health assessments are 1) Soil and Site Stability 2) Hydrologic Function 3) Biotic Integrity.
