= Grazing =

Feeding livestock on forage

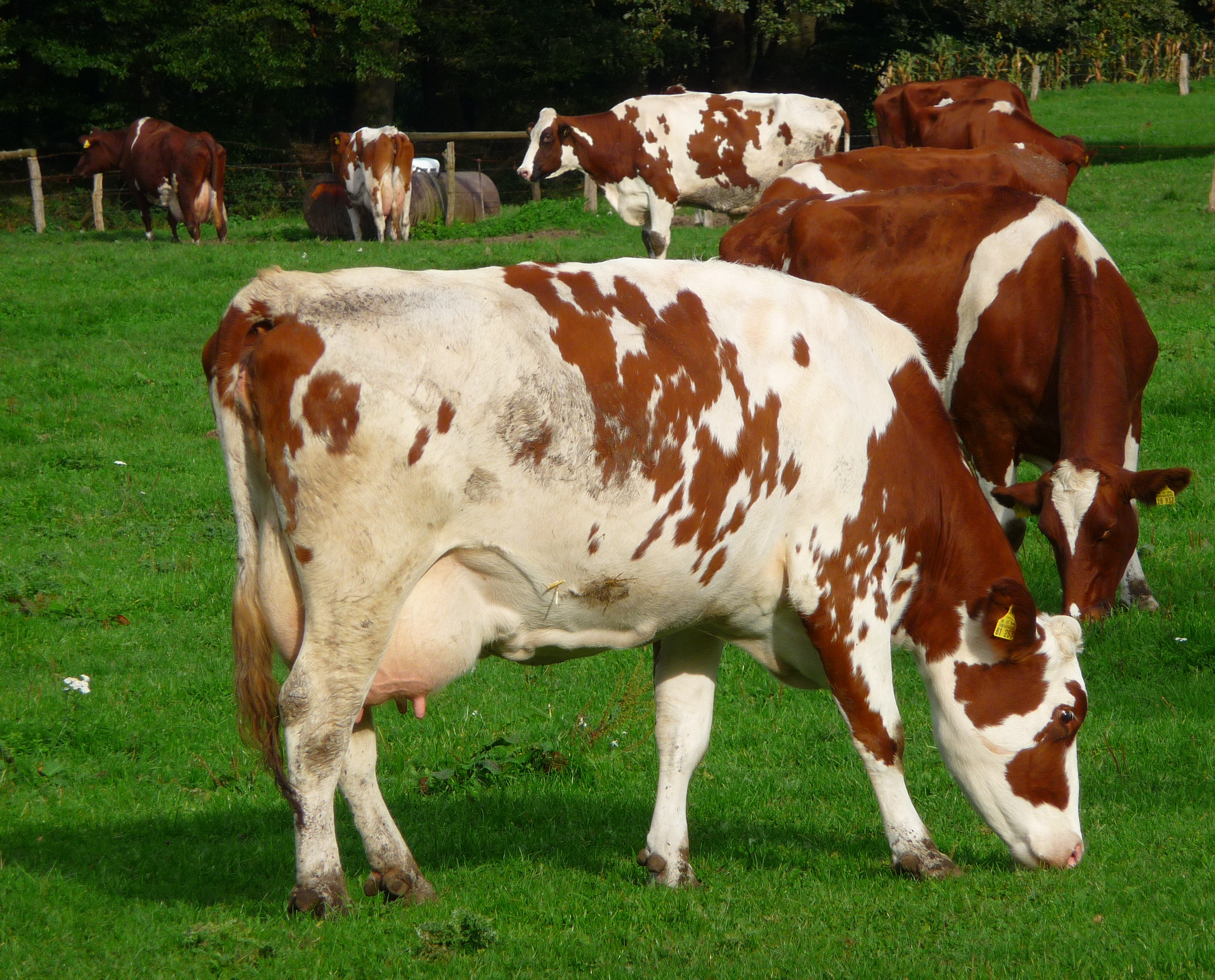
Dairy cows grazing in Germany

Area of permanent meadows and pastures

In agriculture, grazing is a method of animal husbandry whereby domestic livestock are allowed outdoors to free range (roam around) and consume wild vegetation in order to convert the otherwise indigestible (by the human gut) cellulose within grass and other forages into meat, milk, wool and other animal products. Grazing is often done on lands that are unsuitable for arable farming, although there are occasions where arable lands and even prior farmlands are intentionally kept or converted to pastures to raise commercially valuable grazing animals.

Farmers may employ many different strategies of grazing for optimum production: grazing may be continuous, seasonal, or rotational within a grazing period. Longer rotations are found in ley farming, alternating arable and fodder crops; in rest rotation, deferred rotation, and mob grazing, giving grasses a longer time to recover or leaving land fallow. Patch-burn sets up a rotation of fresh grass after burning with two years of rest. Conservation grazing proposes to use grazing animals to improve the biodiversity of a site.

Grazing livestock on open grasslands, i.e. pastoralism, has existed as a human practice since the beginning of agriculture; sheep and goats were domesticated by nomads before the first permanent settlements were constructed around 7000 BC, enabling cattle and pigs to be kept, and people who supervise grazing livestock are called shepherds. In the vast Eurasian steppe, migrating and grazing herds of sheep and horse between different pasture regions had been the primary means of food production for the Inner Asia horseback nomads, with many nomadic empires rose and fell throughout history until the early modern period. During the late Medieval and early modern England, many common lands used by peasants for crop farming were enclosed and converted to pastures controlled by gentries to favor wool trades. In modern era, ranching is the more common method of raising grazing livestock, although artificially made feeds such as hay and fodders are sometimes used to supplement grazing.

Livestock grazing contributes to many negative effects on the environment, including deforestation, extinction of native wildlife, pollution of streams and rivers, overgrazing, soil degradation, ecological disturbance, desertification, and ecosystem stability.

== History ==
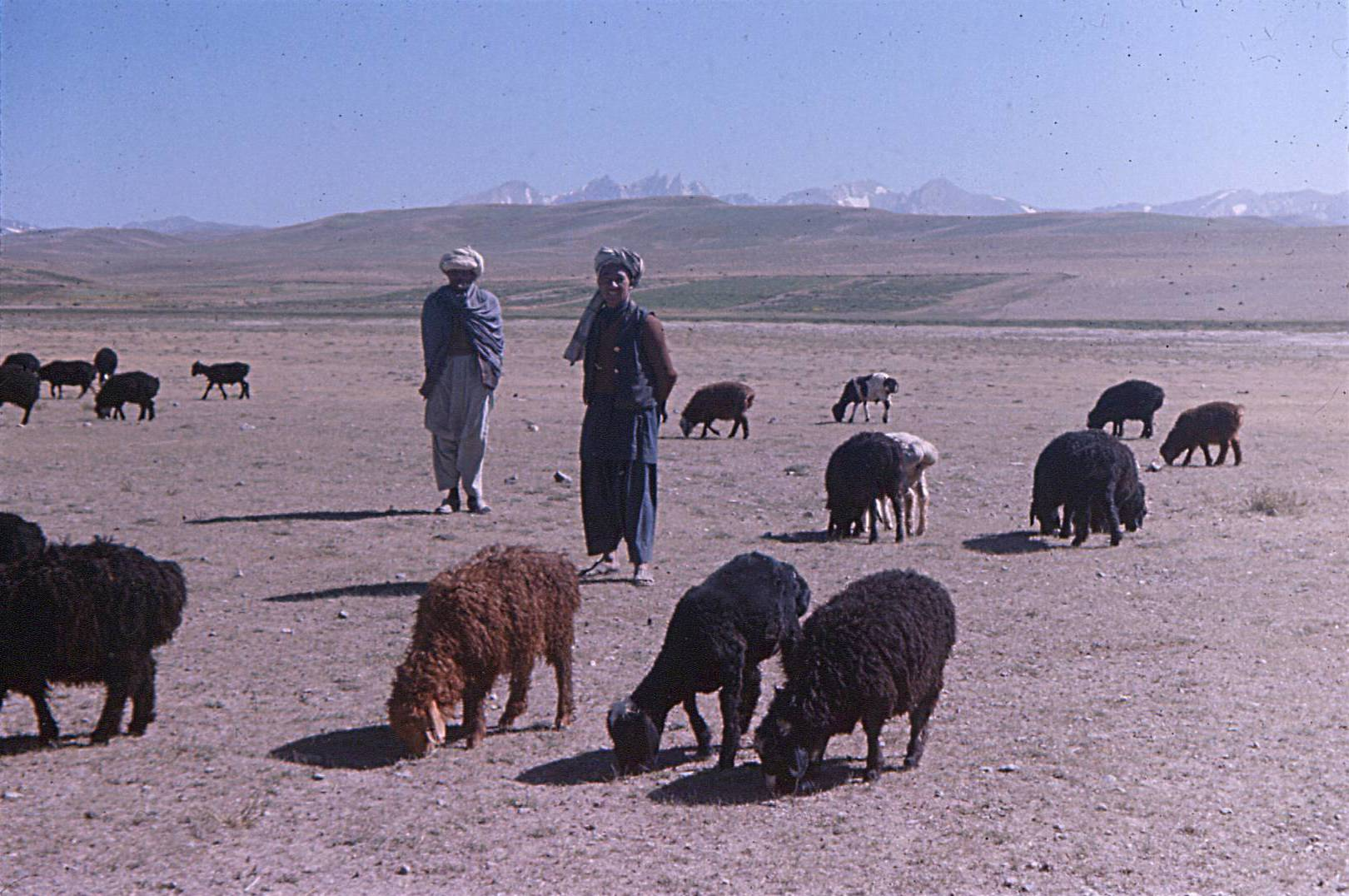
The domestication of ruminants by 7000 BC, like these fat-tailed sheep in Afghanistan, provided nomads across the Middle East and central Asia with a reliable source of food.

Sheep, goats, cattle, and pigs were domesticated early in the history of agriculture. Sheep were domesticated first, soon followed by goats; both species were suitable for nomadic peoples. Cattle and pigs were domesticated somewhat later, around 7000 BC, once people started to live in fixed settlements.

In America, livestock were grazed on public land from the Civil War. The Taylor Grazing Act of 1934 was enacted after the Great Depression to regulate the use of public land for grazing purposes.

== Production ==
According to a report by the Food and Agriculture Organization, about 60% of the world's grassland (just less than half of the world's usable surface) is covered by grazing systems. It states that "Grazing systems supply about 9 percent of the world's production of beef and about 30 percent of the world's production of sheep and goat meat. For an estimated 100 million people in arid areas, and probably a similar number in other zones, grazing livestock is the only possible source of livelihood."

=== Management ===
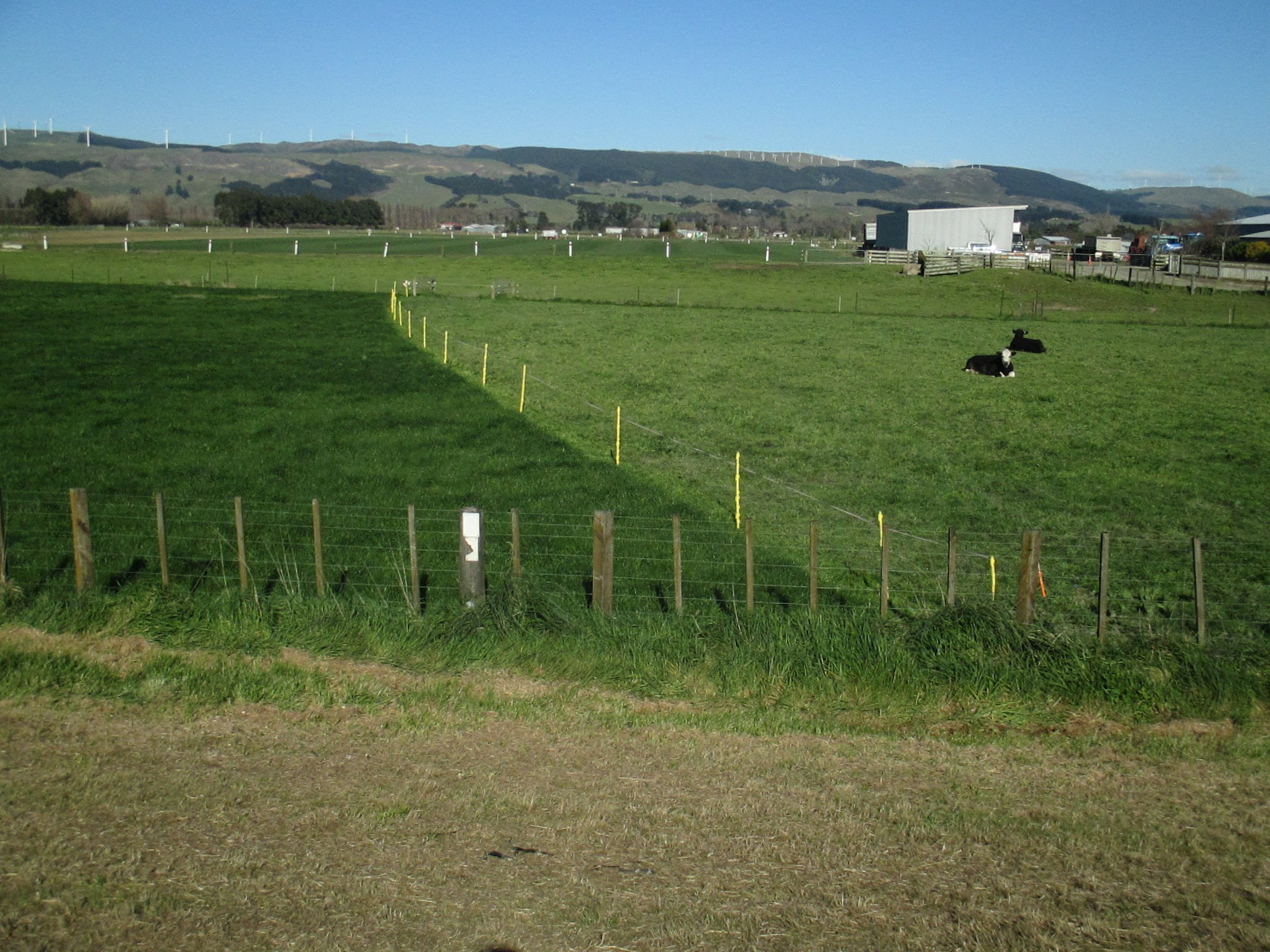
The dark green portion of this pasture in New Zealand is fenced off to allow the grass to regrow before it is grazed again.

Grazing management has two overall goals:

1. Protecting the quality of the pasturage against deterioration by overgrazing: in other words, maintain the sustainability of the pasturage
2. Protecting the health of the animals against acute threats, such as:
  - Grass tetany and nitrate poisoning
  - Trace element overdose, such as molybdenum and selenium poisoning
  - Grass sickness and laminitis in horses
  - Milk sickness in calves

A proper land use and grazing management technique balances

- maintenance of forage and livestock production, with
- maintenance of biodiversity and ecosystem services.

It does this by allowing sufficient recovery periods for regrowth. Producers can keep a low density on a pasture, so as not to overgraze. Controlled burning of the land can help in the regrowth of plants. Although grazing can be problematic for the ecosystem, well-managed grazing techniques can reverse damage and improve the land.

On commons in England and Wales, rights of pasture (grassland grazing) and pannage (forest grazing) for each commoner are tightly defined by number and type of animal, and by the time of year when certain rights can be exercised. For example, the occupier of a particular cottage might be allowed to graze fifteen cattle, four horses, ponies or donkeys, and fifty geese, while the numbers allowed for their neighbours would probably be different. On some commons (such as the New Forest and adjoining commons), the rights are not limited by numbers, and instead a 'marking fee' is paid each year for each animal 'turned out'. However, if excessive use was made of the common, for example, in overgrazing, a common would be 'stinted'; that is, a limit would be put on the number of animals each commoner was allowed to graze. These regulations were responsive to demographic and economic pressure. Thus, rather than let a common become degraded, access was restricted even further.

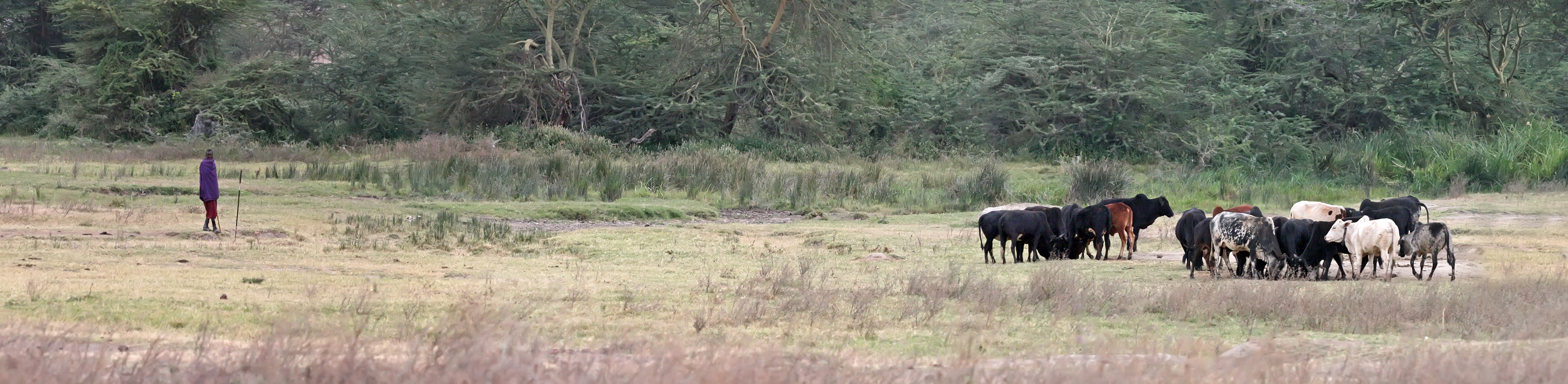
A Maasai herdsman grazing his cattle inside the Ngorongoro crater

== Systems ==
Ranchers and range science researchers have developed grazing systems to improve sustainable forage production for livestock. These can be contrasted with intensive animal farming on feedlots.

=== Continuous ===
Diagram of continuous grazing, a low-input, low-output system

With continuous grazing, livestock is allowed access to the same grazing area throughout the year.

=== Seasonal ===
Seasonal grazing incorporates "grazing animals on a particular area for only part of the year". This allows the land that is not being grazed to rest and allow for new forage to grow.

=== Rotational ===
Diagram of rotational grazing, showing the use of paddocks, each providing food and water for the livestock for a chosen period. The grass is allowed to rest and puddling is reduced, possibly increasing yields. This can be contrasted with feedlot systems.

Rotational grazing "involves dividing the range into several pastures and then grazing each in sequence throughout the grazing period". Utilizing rotational grazing can improve livestock distribution while incorporating rest period for new forage.

=== Ley farming ===
In ley farming, pastures are not permanently planted, but alternated between fodder crops and arable crops.

=== Rest rotation ===
Rest rotation grazing "divides the range into at least four pastures. One pasture remains rested throughout the year and grazing is rotated amongst the residual pastures." This grazing system can be especially beneficial when using sensitive grass that requires time for rest and regrowth.

=== Deferred rotation ===
Deferred rotation "involves at least two pastures with one not grazed until after seed-set". By using deferred rotation, grasses can achieve maximum growth during the period when no grazing occurs.

=== Patch-burn ===
Patch-burn grazing burns a third of a pasture each year, no matter the size of the pasture. This burned patch attracts grazers (cattle or bison) that graze the area heavily because of the fresh grasses that grow as a result. The other patches receive little to no grazing. During the next two years the next two patches are burned consecutively, then the cycle begins anew. In this way, patches receive two years of rest and recovery from the heavy grazing. This technique results in a diversity of habitats that different prairie plants and birds can utilize—mimicking the effects of the pre-historical relationship between bison and fire, whereby bison heavily graze one area and other areas have opportunity to rest, based on the concept of pyric herbivory. The Tallgrass Prairie Preserve in northeastern Oklahoma has been patch-burn grazed with bison herds for over ten years. These efforts have effectively restored the bison–fire relationship on a large landscape scale of 30,000 acres (12,000 ha). In the grazed heathland of Devon, the periodic burning is known as swailing.

=== Riparian area management ===
Riparian area grazing is intended to improve wildlife and their habitats. It uses fencing to keep livestock off ranges near streams or water areas until after wildlife or waterfowl periods, or to limit the amount of grazing to a short period of time.

=== Conservation grazing ===
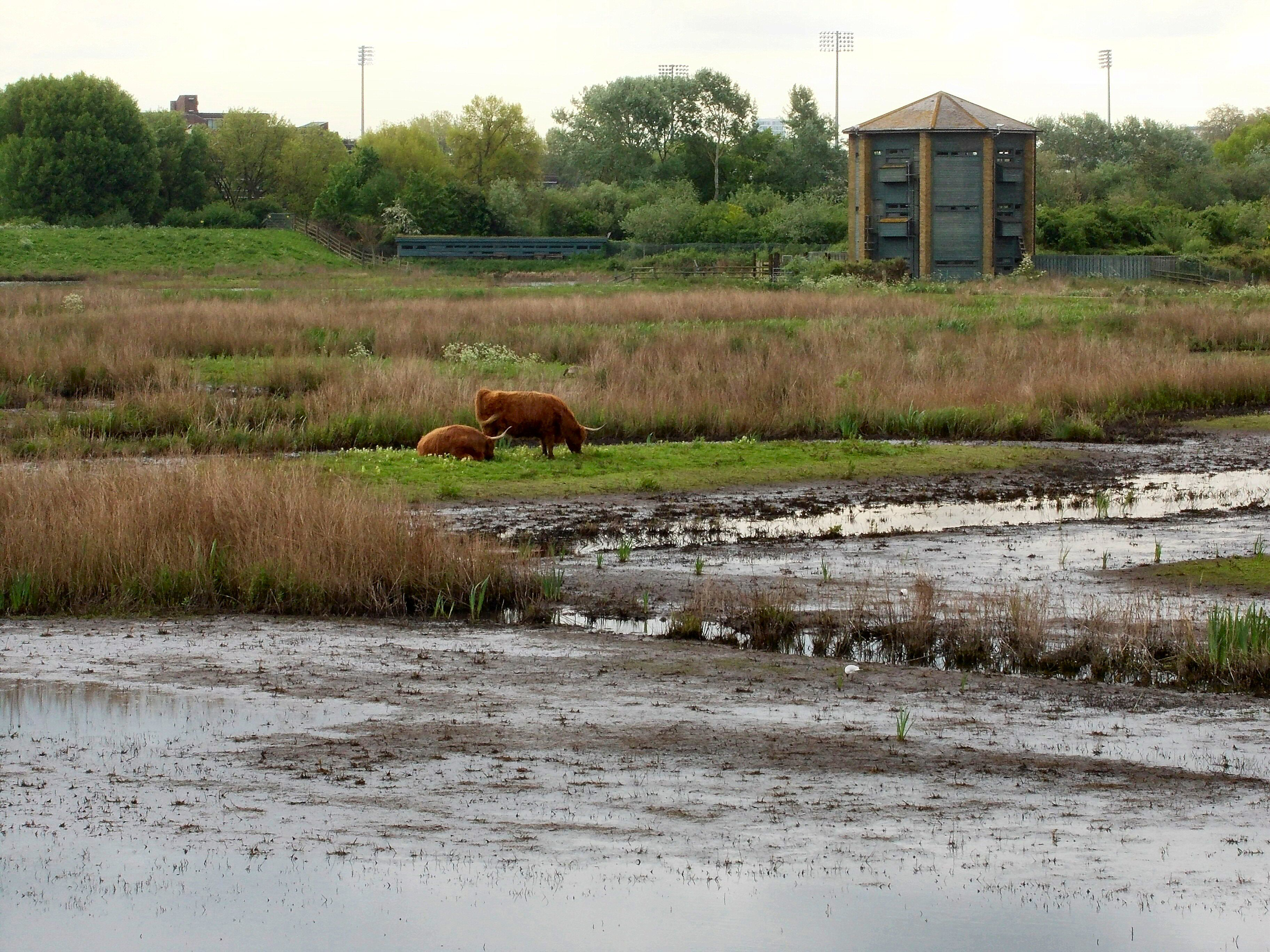
Conservation grazing by Highland Cattle at the London Wetland Centre nature reserve

Conservation grazing is the use of grazing animals to help improve the biodiversity of a site. Due to their hardy nature, rare and native breeds are often used in conservation grazing. In some cases, to re-establish traditional hay meadows, cattle such as the English Longhorn and Highland are used to provide grazing.

=== Cell grazing ===
A form of rotational grazing using as many small paddocks as fencing allows.

=== Mob grazing ===
Mob grazing is a system, said to be more sustainable, invented in 2002; it uses very large herds on land left fallow longer than usual.

== Environmental considerations ==
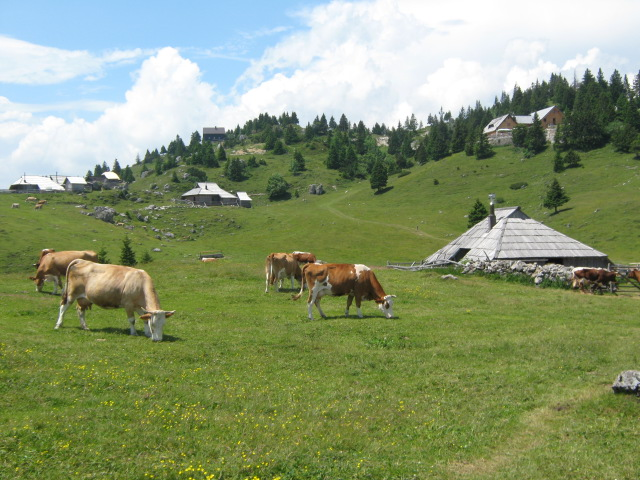
Summer grazing in a high-elevation environment at the Big Pasture Plateau, Slovenia

=== Ecology ===
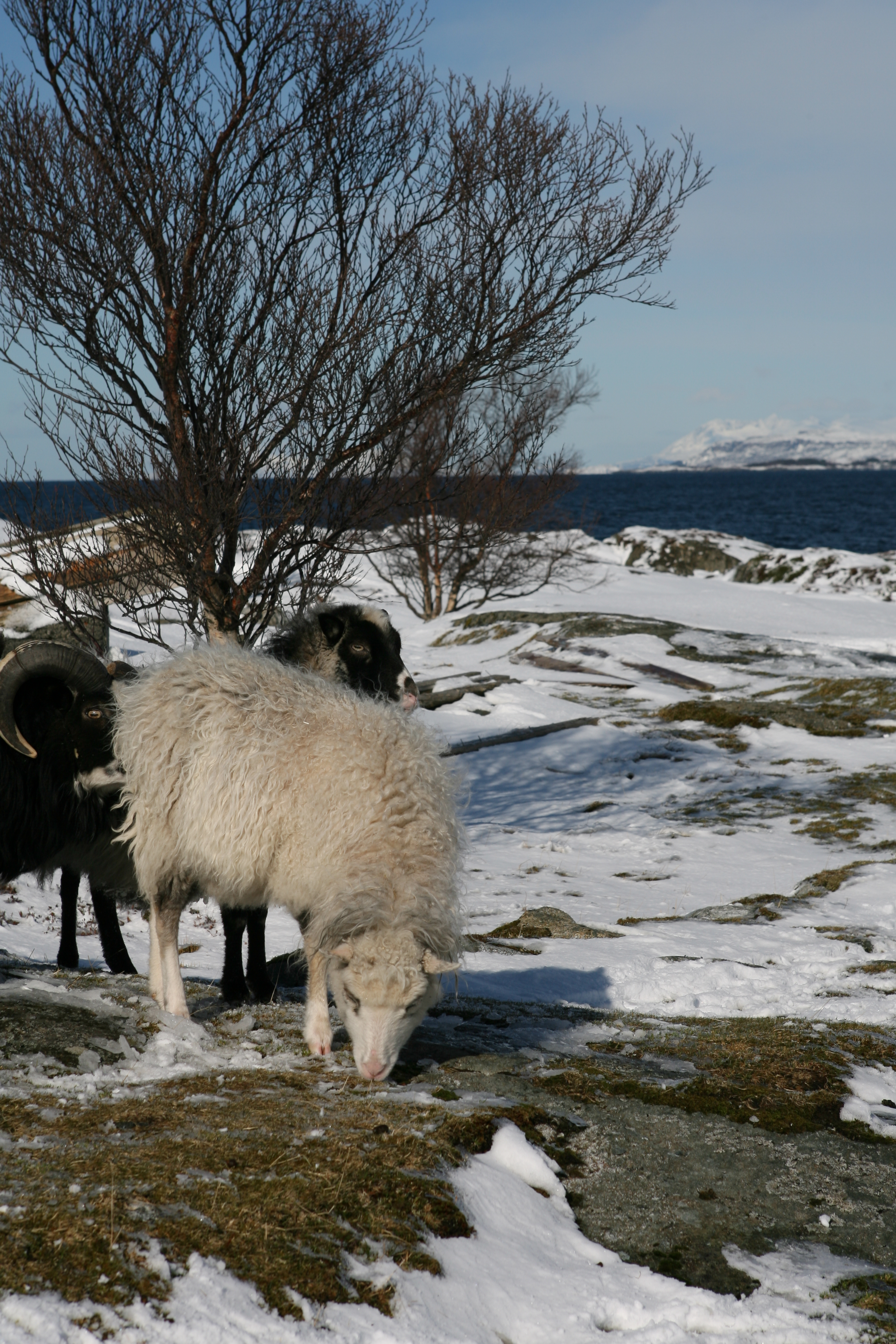
Old Norwegian Sheep grazing at an island on the coast of Norway. This is a vulnerable habitat where the sheep take part in a delicate ecological balance.

Many ecological effects, which may be positive or negative, derive from grazing. Negative effects of grazing may include overgrazing, increased soil erosion, compaction and degradation, deforestation, biodiversity loss, and adverse water quality impacts from run-off. Sometimes grazers can have beneficial environmental effects such as improving the soil with nutrient redistribution and aerating the soil by trampling, and by controlling fire and increasing biodiversity by removing biomass, controlling shrub growth and dispersing seeds. In some habitats, appropriate levels of grazing may be effective in restoring or maintaining native grass and herb diversity in rangeland that has been disturbed by overgrazing, lack of grazing (such as by the removal of wild grazing animals), or by other human disturbance. Conservation grazing is the use of grazers to manage such habitats, often to replicate the ecological effects of the wild relatives of domestic livestock, or those of other species now absent or extinct.

Grazer urine and faeces "recycle nitrogen, phosphorus, potassium and other plant nutrients and return them to the soil". Grazing can reduce the accumulation of litter (organic matter) in some seasons and areas, but can also increase it, which may help to combat soil erosion. This acts as nutrition for insects and organisms found within the soil. These organisms "aid in carbon sequestration and water filtration".

When grass is grazed, dead grass and litter are reduced, which is advantageous for birds such as waterfowl. Grazing can increase biodiversity. Without grazing, many of the same grasses grow, for example brome and bluegrass, consequently producing a monoculture. The ecosystems of North American tallgrass prairies are controlled to a large extent by nitrogen availability, which is itself controlled by interactions between fires and grazing by large herbivores. Fires in spring enhance the growth of certain grasses. Herbivores preferentially graze these grasses, producing a system of checks and balances, and allowing higher plant biodiversity. In Europe heathland is a cultural landscape which requires grazing by cattle, sheep or other grazers to be maintained.

=== Conservation ===
An author of the Food and Agriculture Organization (FAO) report Livestock's Long Shadow, stated in an interview:

Grazing occupies 26 percent of Earth's terrestrial surface ... feed crop production requires about a third of all arable land ... Expansion of grazing land for livestock is also a leading cause of deforestation, especially in Latin America ... In the Amazon basin alone, about 70 percent of previously forested land is used as pasture, while feed crops cover a large part of the remainder.

Much grazing land has resulted from a process of clearance or drainage of other habitats such as woodland or wetland.

According to the opinion of the Center for Biological Diversity, extensive grazing of livestock in the arid lands of the southwestern United States has many negative impacts on the local biodiversity there.

Cattle destroy native vegetation, damage soils and stream banks, and contaminate waterways with fecal waste. After decades of livestock grazing, once-lush streams and riparian forests have been reduced to flat, dry wastelands; once-rich topsoil has been turned to dust, causing soil erosion, stream sedimentation and wholesale elimination of some aquatic habitats

In arid climates such as the southwestern United States, livestock grazing has severely degraded riparian areas, the wetland environment adjacent to rivers or streams. The Environmental Protection Agency states that agriculture has a greater impact on stream and river contamination than any other nonpoint source. Improper grazing of riparian areas can contribute to nonpoint source pollution of riparian areas. Riparian zones in arid and semiarid environments have been called biodiversity hotspots. The water, higher biomass, favorable microclimate and periodic flood events together produce higher biological diversity than in the surrounding uplands. In 1990, "according to the Arizona state park department, over 90% of the original riparian zones of Arizona and New Mexico are gone". A 1988 report of the Government Accountability Office estimated that 90% of the 5,300 miles of riparian habitat managed by the Bureau of Land Management in Colorado was in an unsatisfactory condition, as was 80% of Idaho's riparian zones, concluding that "poorly managed livestock grazing is the major cause of degraded riparian habitat on federal rangelands".

A 2013 FAO report estimated livestock were responsible for 14.5% of anthropogenic greenhouse gas emissions. Grazing is common in New Zealand; in 2004, methane and nitrous oxide from agriculture made up somewhat less than half of New Zealand's greenhouse gas emissions, of which most is attributable to livestock. A 2008 United States Environmental Protection Agency report on emissions found agriculture was responsible for 6% of total United States greenhouse gas emissions in 2006. This included rice production, enteric fermentation in domestic livestock, livestock manure management, and agricultural soil management, but omitted some things that might be attributable to agriculture. Studies comparing the methane emissions from grazing and feedlot cattle concluded that grass-fed cattle produce much more methane than grain-fed cattle. One study in the Journal of Animal Science found four times as much, and stated: "these measurements clearly document higher CH_{4} production for cattle receiving low-quality, high-fiber diets than for cattle fed high-grain diets".

=== Carbon sequestration ===
Several peer-reviewed studies have found that excluding livestock completely from semi-arid grasslands can lead to significant recovery of vegetation and soil carbon sequestration. A 2021 peer-reviewed paper found that sparsely grazed and natural grasslands account for 80% of the total cumulative carbon sink of the world's grasslands, whereas managed grasslands (i.e. with greater livestock density) have been a net greenhouse gas source over the past decade. A 2011 study found that multi-paddock grazing of the type endorsed by Savory resulted in more soil carbon sequestration than heavy continuous grazing, but very slightly less soil carbon sequestration than "graze exclosure" (excluding grazing livestock from land). Another peer-reviewed paper found that if current pastureland was restored to its former state as wild grasslands, shrublands, and sparse savannas without livestock this could store an estimated 15.2 - 59.9 Gt additional carbon.

One study suggests that total conversion of livestock raising to AMP grazing practices coupled with conservation cropping has the potential to convert North American farmlands to a carbon sink, sequestering approximately 1.2 Pg-C y^{−1}. Over the next 25–50 years, the cumulative sequestration potential is 30-60 Pg-C. Additions of organic manures and compost further build soil organic carbon, thus contributing to carbon sequestration potential. However, a study by the Food and Climate Research Network in 2017 estimates that, on the basis of meta-study of the scientific literature, the total global soil carbon sequestration potential from grazing management ranges from 0.3-0.8 Gt CO2eq per year, which is equivalent to offsetting a maximum of 4-11% of current total global livestock emissions, and that "Expansion or intensification in the grazing sector as an approach to sequestering more carbon would lead to substantial increases in methane, nitrous oxide and land use change-induced CO2 emissions", leading to an overall increase in emissions. However, a study by the Food and Climate Research Network in 2017 estimates that, on the basis of meta-study of the scientific literature, the total global soil carbon sequestration potential from grazing management ranges from 0.3-0.8 Gt CO2eq per year, which is equivalent to offsetting a maximum of 4-11% of current total global livestock emissions, and that "Expansion or intensification in the grazing sector as an approach to sequestering more carbon would lead to substantial increases in methane, nitrous oxide and land use change-induced CO2 emissions", leading to an overall increase in emissions. A 2022 peer-reviewed paper estimated the carbon sequestration potential of improved grazing management at a similar level of 0.15-0.70 Gt CO2eq per year.

=== Agrivoltaics ===
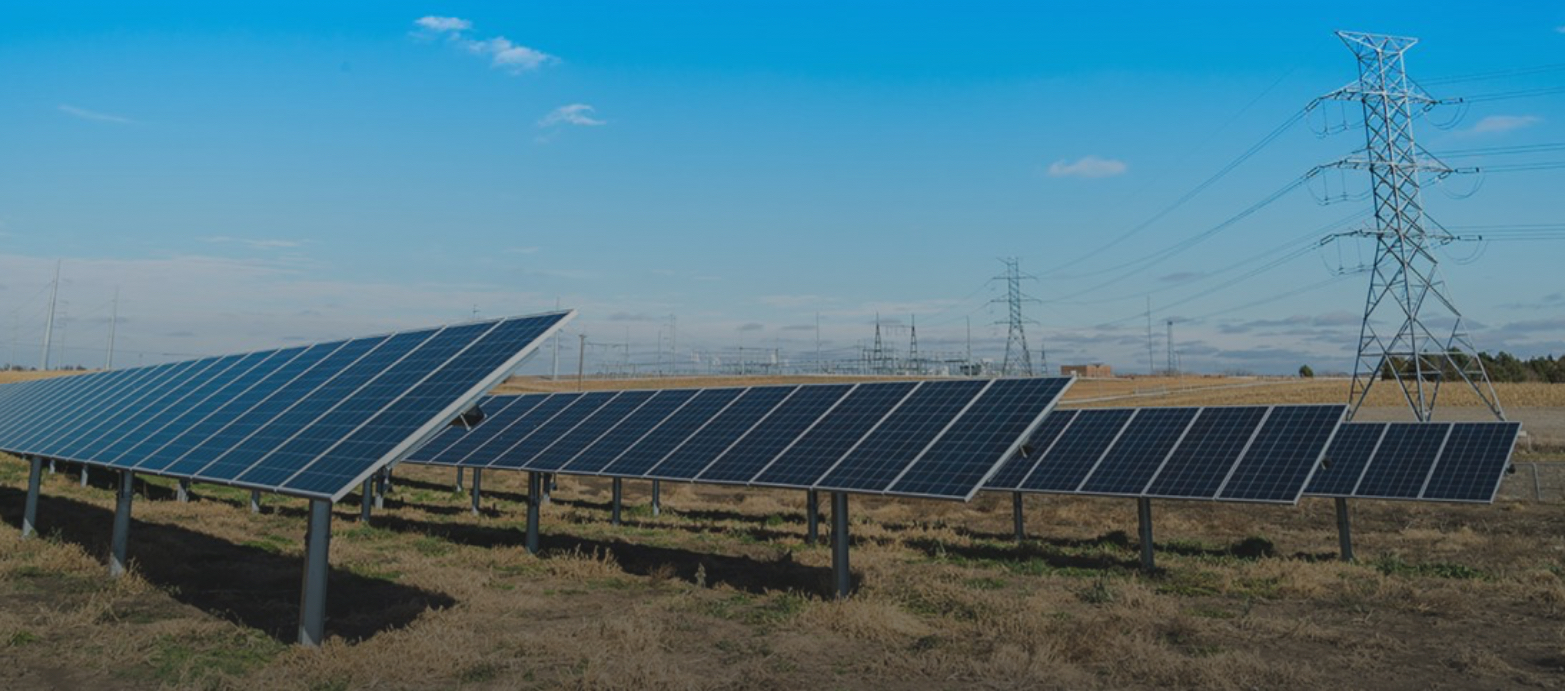
Solar array over grazing field

Agrivoltaics for grazing allows for shade for the animals and the vegetation so the soil retains a higher moisture level. This approach not only reduces maintenance costs by minimizing the need for mechanical mowing but also enhances land productivity by integrating renewable energy production with agricultural use. In the United States, more than 100,000 sheep graze at solar arrays, primarily in the South. Organizations such as the American Solar Grazing Association (ASGA) promotes best practices for co-locating solar energy and grazing operations.

== See also ==
- Cattle feeding
- Grazing rights
